= 2023 NCAA Division I women's basketball championship game =

Women's basketball championship game

NCAA Division I women's basketball championship game
National championship game
LSU Tigers	Iowa Hawkeyes
SEC	Big Ten
(33–2)	(31–6)
102	85
Head coach: Kim Mulkey	Head coach: Lisa Bluder
- AP: 9
- Coaches: 6
- AP: 3
- Coaches: 3
	1	2	3	4	Total
LSU Tigers	27	32	16	27	102
Iowa Hawkeyes	22	20	22	21	85
- Date: April 2, 2023
- Venue: American Airlines Center, Dallas, Texas
- MVP: Angel Reese, LSU
- Favorite: Iowa by 3
- Referees: Lisa Jones, Michol Murray, Pualani Spurlock-Welsh
- Attendance: 19,482
- National anthem: Britney Holmes

United States TV coverage
- Network: ABC
- Announcers: Ryan Ruocco (play-by-play); Rebecca Lobo (analyst); Holly Rowe (sideline); Andraya Carter (sideline)
- Nielsen Ratings: 1.97 (9.17 million)

The 2023 NCAA Division I women's basketball championship game was the final game of the 2023 NCAA Division I women's basketball tournament. It determined the national champion for the 2022–23 NCAA Division I women's basketball season and was contested by the Iowa Hawkeyes from the Big Ten Conference and the Louisiana State (LSU) Tigers from the Southeastern Conference. The game was played on April 2, 2023, at the American Airlines Center in Dallas, Texas. In the game, LSU defeated Iowa 102–85 to win their first national championship, setting a record for most points scored by a team in an NCAA women's basketball championship game. LSU's Angel Reese recorded a double-double and was voted the Most Outstanding Player (MOP) of the Final Four.

LSU's victory gave them their first women's basketball national championship and the fourth in the head coaching career of Kim Mulkey. Much media attention was directed to Angel Reese for a taunting gesture made to Iowa's Caitlin Clark near the end of the game, fomenting the Clark–Reese rivalry. LSU held a championship parade in Baton Rouge and were invited to the White House.

The championship game was televised on ABC and the broadcast broke numerous records, including the highest viewership for a women's college basketball game at 9.9 million; the semifinal game between Iowa and top-ranked South Carolina was itself the third-highest-viewed women's college basketball game in ESPN's history. It was also the most-viewed college sporting event ever shown on the ESPN+ streaming service, and the year-over-year viewership from the 2022 championship game more than doubled.

== Participants ==
=== LSU Tigers ===
The Tigers, representing Louisiana State University (LSU) in Baton Rouge, Louisiana, were led by second-year head coach Kim Mulkey for the 2022–23 season. LSU finished the regular season with a record of 27–1, and a conference record of 15–1. Their only loss during the regular season was an away game against South Carolina, ranked No. 1 by the AP Poll. They were seeded second in the SEC tournament, where they defeated Georgia before losing to Tennessee in the semifinals.

LSU received an at-large invitation to the NCAA tournament and were placed in the Greenville Regional 2 as the No. 3 seed. As a top-four seed, LSU hosted first- and second-round games at their home arena, Pete Maravich Assembly Center. LSU faced No. 14 seed Hawaii in their first-round game, and won 73–50; the other game played in Baton Rouge saw No. 6 seed Michigan defeat No. 11 seed UNLV, setting up a second-round matchup between LSU and Michigan. Two days later, on March 19, LSU defeated Michigan 66–42 to advance to the regional semifinals. They traveled to Bon Secours Wellness Arena in Greenville, South Carolina, for their next game against No. 2 seed Utah, where they won by three points. This placed them into the regional final round, where they defeated No. 9 seed Miami to advance to their fifth Final Four and their first since 2008. There, they were matched up against Virginia Tech, the No. 1 seed from the Seattle Regional 3. The Tigers were favored to win the game by two points and ended up winning by seven to advance to the national championship game.

=== Iowa Hawkeyes ===
The Hawkeyes, representing the University of Iowa in Iowa City, Iowa, were led by head coach Lisa Bluder in her 23rd season at the school. Ranked No. 4 in the AP preseason poll, they won their first three games of the season before suffering a loss to Kansas State. They participated in the Phil Knight Invitational tournament, where they defeated Oregon State but lost to No. 3 UConn and No. 12 NC State. They faced numerous other ranked teams throughout the season, with wins over No. 2 Ohio State, No. 8 Maryland, and No. 2 Indiana, and losses to No. 2 Indiana and No. 7 Maryland. They finished the regular season with a record of 23–6 and a conference record of 15–3. Caitlin Clark earned consensus national player of the year honors. The Hawkeyes received the No. 2 seed in the Big Ten tournament, where they defeated Purdue, Maryland, and Ohio State on consecutive days to win the conference championship.

Iowa received the Big Ten's automatic invitation to the NCAA tournament by virtue of their conference tournament championship and were selected as the No. 2 seed in the Seattle Regional 4. Like LSU, the Hawkeyes hosted first- and second- round games at their home arena, Carver–Hawkeye Arena in Iowa City, and they defeated No. 15 seed Southeastern Louisiana in their first-round game. The other first-round game played in Iowa City saw No. 10 seed Georgia defeat No. 7 seed Florida State, and Iowa defeated Georgia by eight points in the second round to advance to the regional semifinal. There, they faced and defeated No. 6 seed Colorado at Climate Pledge Arena in Seattle, and took down No. 5 seed Louisville in a game whose viewership bested any NBA on ESPN broadcast during the 2022–23 season to reach the Final Four of the NCAA tournament for the first time since 1993. They won 77–73 over defending national champion South Carolina, who were undefeated at 36–0, to reach the final; the game was widely viewed as an upset since South Carolina were "heavy favorites" not only to defeat Iowa but also to repeat as national champions. Further, the ESPN broadcast of the game drew 5.5 million viewers and set records as the most-watched NCAA semifinal and third-most-viewed women's college basketball game in ESPN's history.

== Starting lineups ==
LSU	Position	Iowa
Angel Reese	F	Monika Czinano
Ladazhia Williams	F	McKenna Warnock
Flau'jae Johnson	G	Caitlin Clark
Kateri Poole	G	Gabbie Marshall
Alexis Morris	G	Kate Martin

== Game summary ==
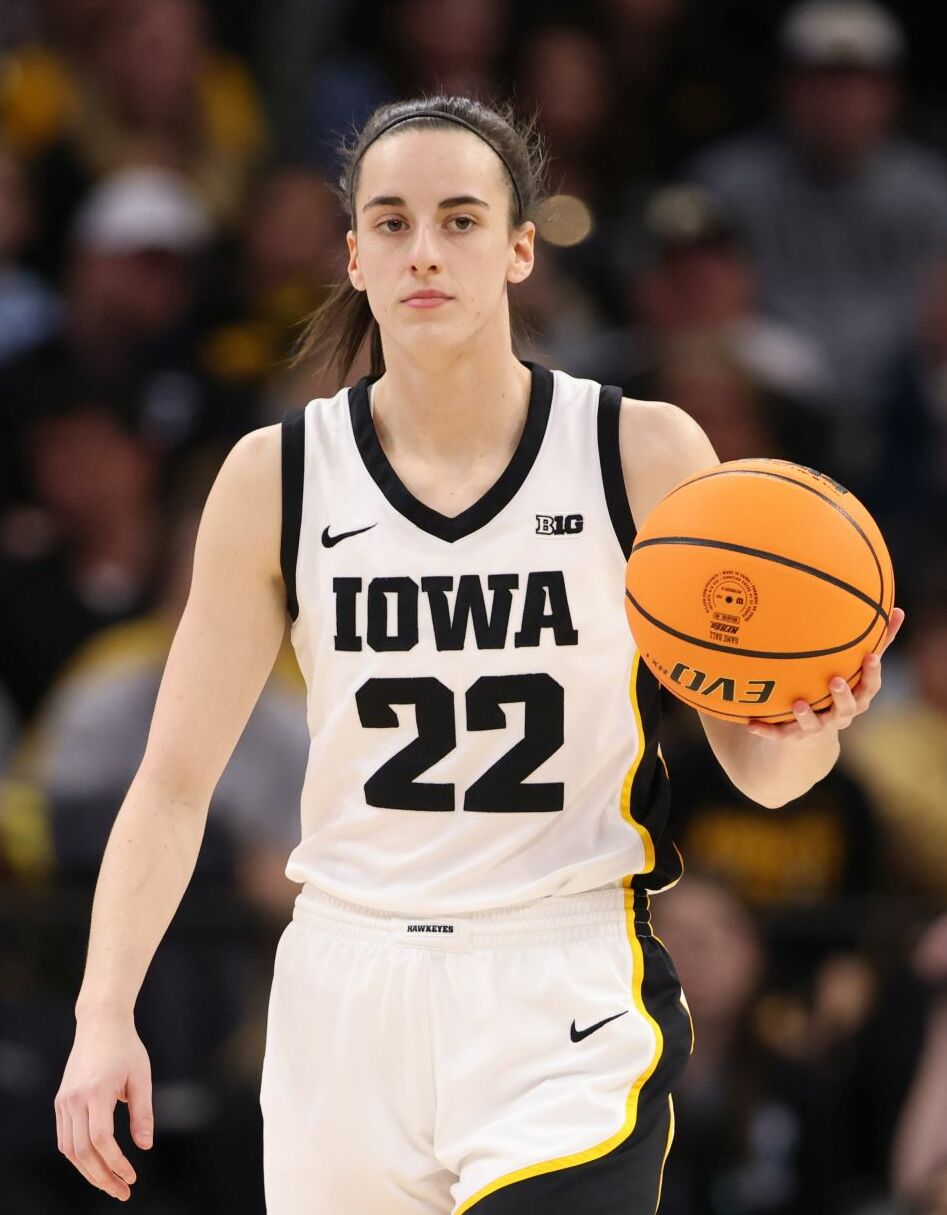
Iowa's Caitlin Clark led all scorers with 30 points.

LSU won the opening tip, but Iowa scored the game's first point with a two-point field goal from Monika Czinano. LSU's Flau'jae Johnson gave the Tigers their first lead seconds later with a three-point field goal, though Iowa took it back with shots made by Kate Martin and Caitlin Clark. The teams traded baskets and tied at 9–9 and 12–12 before a three-pointer by Kateri Poole and a free throw by Angel Reese put LSU in front by four points. The game was tied again shortly thereafter with back-to-back three pointers from Clark and a two-point jumper from Alexis Morris; a pair of free throws for each team tied it again at 20 points apiece with under three minutes remaining. With under a minute remaining, LSU took their largest lead of the quarter—five points—after Jasmine Carson made a three-point jumper, and the quarter ended with LSU maintaining this lead; the score was 27–22 in favor of the Tigers.

Iowa regained the lead two minutes into the second quarter; three-pointers from Gabbie Marshall and Martin brought the deficit within one point and a layup by Hannah Stuelke put Iowa in front. LSU retook the lead within a minute and expanded it to seven points with three-pointers made by Carson and Last-Tear Poa. Free throws and layups allowed Iowa to make up some of the deficit, but back-to-back three-point shots by Carson pushed LSU's lead to as many as thirteen points with four minutes until halftime. After a layup by Marshall, the score remained 49–38 for nearly a minute until Iowa's McKenna Warnock made a free throw. Poa's three-pointer immediately afterwards bumped the Tigers' lead back to thirteen, and the teams traded jumpers until the final thirty seconds of the half, when Johnson scored a layup and a turnover by Martin led to a three-pointer by Carson with one second remaining. LSU led at halftime by a score of 59–42.

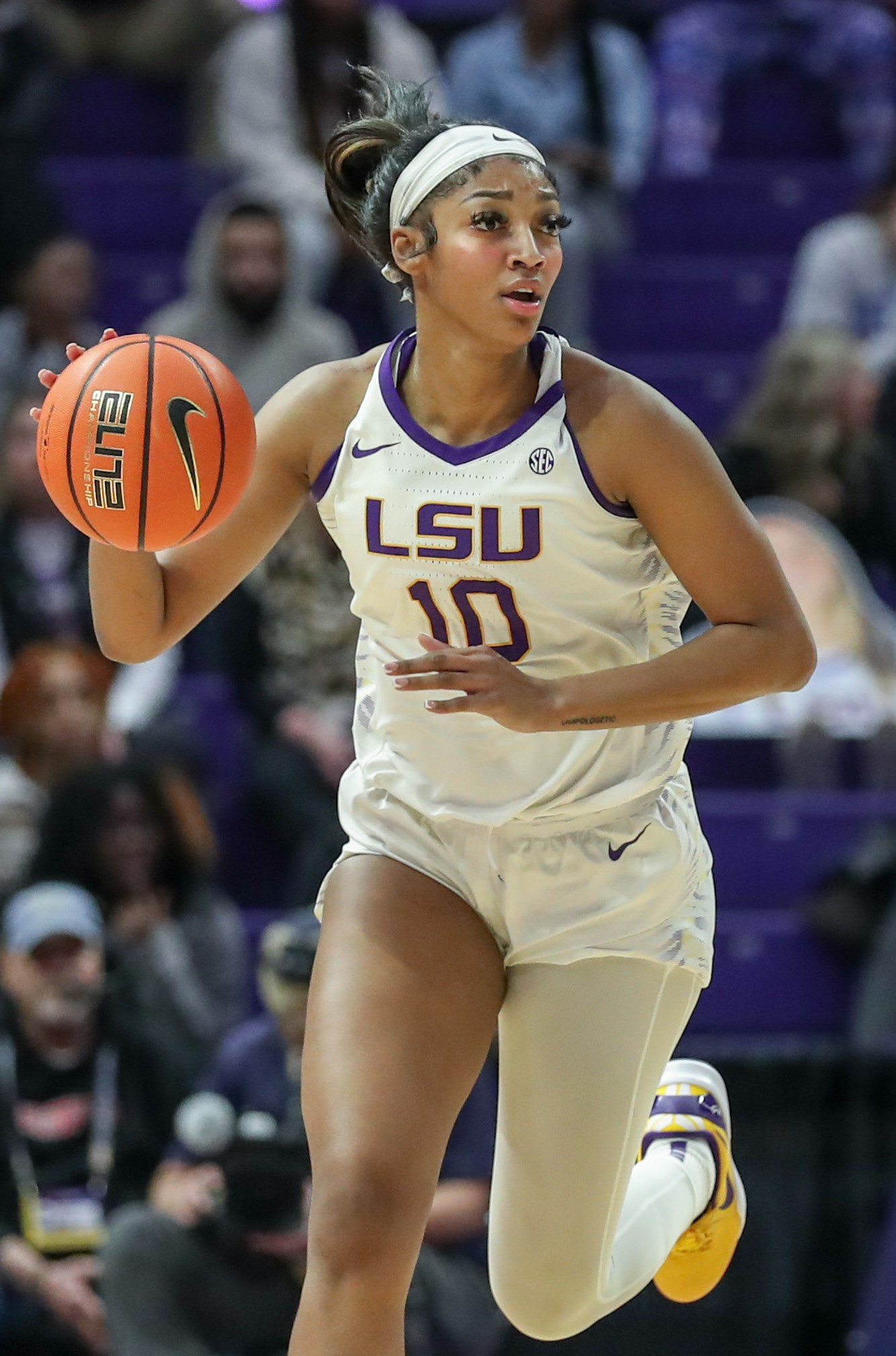
Angel Reese of LSU was named Most Outstanding Player of the Final Four.

LSU built on to their lead by scoring the first four points of the second half through LaDazhia Williams and Reese. A three-pointer by Clark with 7:56 remaining started a run for Iowa that saw the Hawkeyes score twelve consecutive points, which cut LSU's lead from 21 points down to nine. The lead narrowed further after Clark made another three-pointer with 5:22 to play, and back-to-back layups by the Tigers were followed by a Clark three-pointer that kept the deficit at nine points. Both teams traded field goals for the next two minutes; a pair of free throws by Morris with 1:03 on the clock ended up being the final points scored before the end of the third quarter. Iowa outscored LSU by six points in the third quarter, and trailed 75–64 entering the fourth.

Iowa scored the first five points of the fourth quarter, cutting LSU's lead to eight points, before two jumpers by Morris and a layup by Williams pushed it to 14. Two free throws by Czinano and a layup by Warnock for Iowa were countered by a layup by Reese and a jumper by Morris for LSU, leaving the Tigers' lead at 14. Clark's three-pointer with 5:21 remaining shrunk LSU's lead to 13 points, though a jump shot by Morris just under a minute later bumped their lead to 16 points. Clark and Williams traded layups, and a jumper by Morris with under two minutes left made the score 95–82. After a pair of fouls on Iowa, Poole made a three-pointer to extend the lead to sixteen points. Carson then made one of her two free throws with 53 seconds remaining to make the score 99–82. Martin scored Iowa's final points with a three-pointer assisted by Molly Davis, and the game's final points were scored on a three-pointer by Morris with 27 seconds remaining to push the score to 102–85. Marshall attempted a three-pointer for the Hawkeyes with 15 seconds left, but she missed and a rebound by Williams allowed LSU to run out the clock and secure the 17-point victory for their first national championship in program history.

Reese was named the Most Outstanding Player (MOP) of the Final Four; she finished the championship game with a double-double, scoring 15 points and securing 10 rebounds, and tallied a season-high five assists. She was named to the all-tournament team alongside teammates Morris and Carson, Iowa's Clark, and Zia Cooke of South Carolina. Clark, the consensus National Player of the Year, led all scorers with 30 points and set a record with 191 total points over the course of the tournament. The game set several offensive and scoring records: LSU's 102 total points were the fourth-most they had scored in a game during the season and the most that had ever been scored in an NCAA Division I women's championship game; Iowa's 85 points also marked the most points ever scored by the losing team in a women's championship game. Additionally, LSU's 59 points in the first half marked a new NCAA women's championship game record.

LSU head coach Kim Mulkey became the first coach to win a Division I women's basketball national championship as the head coach at two different schools with the victory; she won three during her tenure as the head coach at Baylor from 2000 to 2021.

The next night, Reese's cousin Jordan Hawkins helped the University of Connecticut win its fifth men's title in school history.

ABC

April 2, 2023
2:30 p.m. CDT

Report

No. 3 LSU Tigers 102, No. 2 Iowa Hawkeyes 85
Scoring by quarter: 27–22, 32–20, 16–22, 27–21
Pts: J. Carson – 22; Rebs: A. Reese – 10; Asts: A. Morris – 9	Pts: C. Clark – 30; Rebs: M. Czinano, M. Warnock – 6 Asts: C. Clark – 8

American Airlines Center, Dallas, Texas
Attendance: 19,482
Referees: Lisa Jones, Michol Murray, Pualani Spurlock-Welsh

Starters:			Pts	Reb	Ast
F	10	Angel Reese	15	10	5
F	0	LaDazhia Williams	20	5	0
G	4	Flau'jae Johnson	10	7	4
G	55	Kateri Poole	6	3	1
G	45	Alexis Morris	21	2	9
Reserves:					
F	5	Sa'Myah Smith	2	2	0
G	13	Last-Tear Poa	6	0	2
G	2	Jasmine Carson	22	3	1
Head coach:
Kim Mulkey

LSU	Iowa

LSU	Statistics	Iowa
38/70 (54%)	Field goals	28/56 (50%)
11/17 (65%)	3-pt field goals	14/30 (47%)
15/21 (71%)	Free throws	15/20 (75%)
14	Offensive rebounds	7
23	Defensive rebounds	19
37	Total rebounds	26
22	Assists	20
12	Turnovers	16
8	Steals	7
3	Blocks	5
18	Fouls	19

Starters:			Pts	Reb	Ast
F	25	Monika Czinano	13	6	3
F	14	McKenna Warnock	9	6	1
G	22	Caitlin Clark	30	2	8
G	24	Gabbie Marshall	12	1	1
G	20	Kate Martin	13	2	6
Reserves:					
F	45	Hannah Stuelke	2	1	0
F	44	Addison O'Grady	4	5	0
G	3	Sydney Affolter	0	0	0
G	1	Molly Davis	2	1	1
Head coach:
Lisa Bluder

== Media coverage ==
The championship game was televised in the United States by ABC, with Ryan Ruocco on play-by-play commentary, Rebecca Lobo as the analyst, and Holly Rowe and Andraya Carter as sideline reporters. The broadcast broke several records including the largest-ever viewership for a women's college basketball game, with 9.9 million viewers and a peak viewership of 12.6 million. This marked an increase in viewership of 103% from the championship game the year prior (which was televised exclusively by ESPN in primetime), and was also the most-viewed college sporting event ever shown on the ESPN+ streaming service.

The records broken by this game were consistent with a larger trend in women's basketball and women's sports more broadly: the WNBA saw a 16% increase in viewership during its 2022 season—its most-watched in 14 years—compared to the season before.

== Aftermath ==
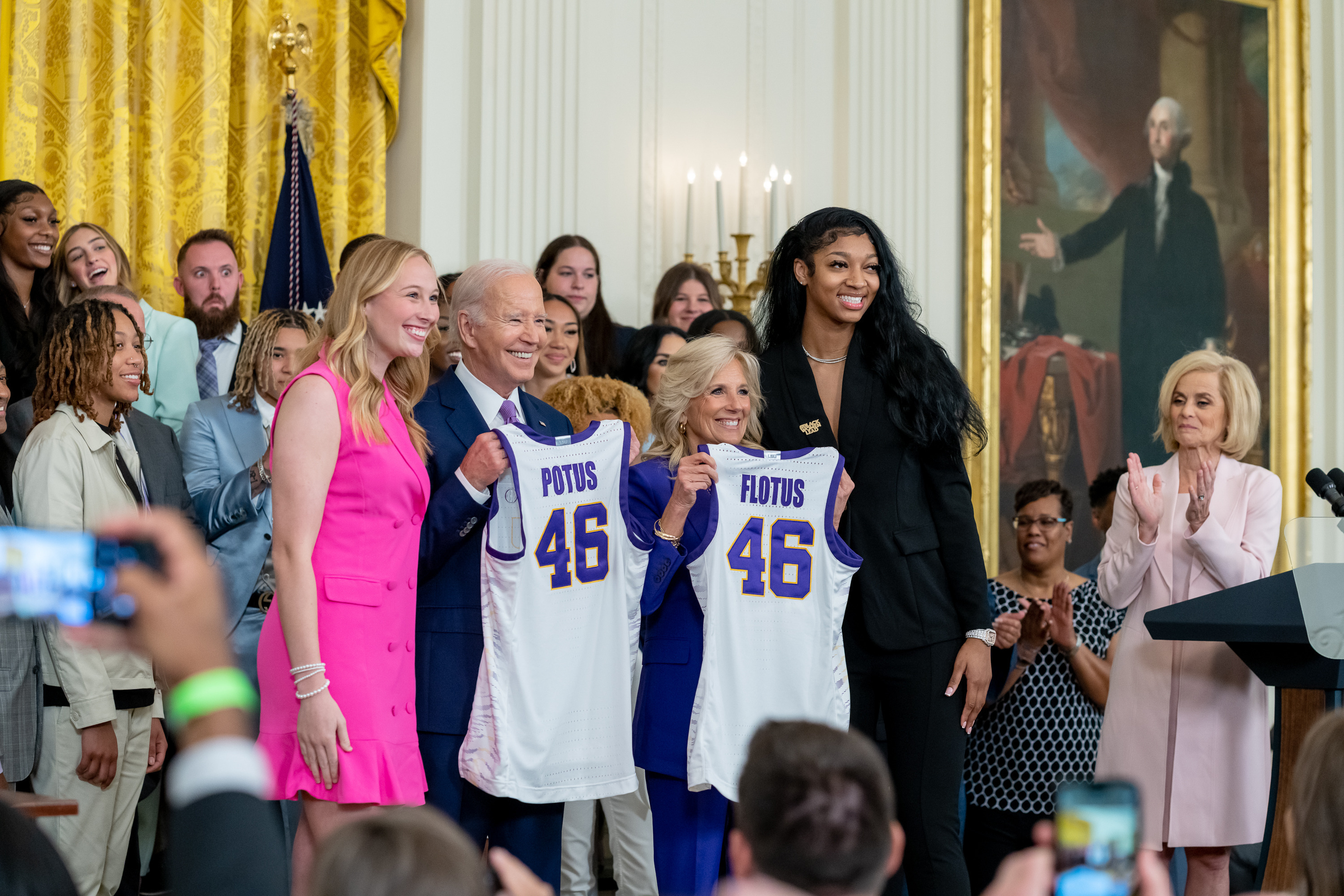
LSU players Emily Ward (left, in pink) and Angel Reese (right, in black) present jerseys to President Joe Biden and First Lady Jill Biden during their May 26, 2023, visit to the White House.

In the immediate aftermath of the game, much attention was directed to a gesture made by Angel Reese towards Caitlin Clark. Near the end of the fourth quarter, Reese was seen making a gesture that involved moving her hand in front of her face, a taunt popularized by John Cena, before pointing to her ring finger in an allusion to a championship ring. These taunts drew criticism from some journalists and analysts, but Reese later defended the gesture and remarked on a similar gesture made by Clark to an opponent during Iowa's regional final game against Louisville.

The backlash Reese (who is Black) received on social media—the term "classless" trended on Twitter shortly after the end of the game—prompted some to point out a potential double standard as Clark (who is white) received no similar backlash for her similar actions, instead receiving praise from Cena himself for the move and her performance in that game. Reese said that the criticism was tied to her identity and that she was considered "too hood" and "too ghetto" to "fit the narrative."

LSU held a championship parade in Baton Rouge on April 5; the parade route ended at their home arena, Pete Maravich Assembly Center. A celebration inside the arena took place afterwards. Following the game, First Lady Jill Biden commended Iowa for their sportsmanship and praised both teams on their play. She remarked that she wanted Iowa to be invited to the White House along with LSU, as an addition to the custom of the president and first lady hosting the national champions. This comment drew ire from several people, including Reese, Alexis Morris, ESPN host Stephen A. Smith, and Representative Troy Carter, and the matter was clarified the following day by Biden's press secretary, Vanessa Valdivia, who said that LSU would be the only team invited to the White House celebration. Reese remarked that she would decline the invitation, and said that she would rather visit the Obama family instead of the Bidens, though she ultimately attended the White House visit alongside the rest of the team on May 26, 2023.

== See also ==
- 2023 NCAA Division I men's basketball championship game, which also took place in Texas.
