= Kate Martin =

American basketball player (born 2000)

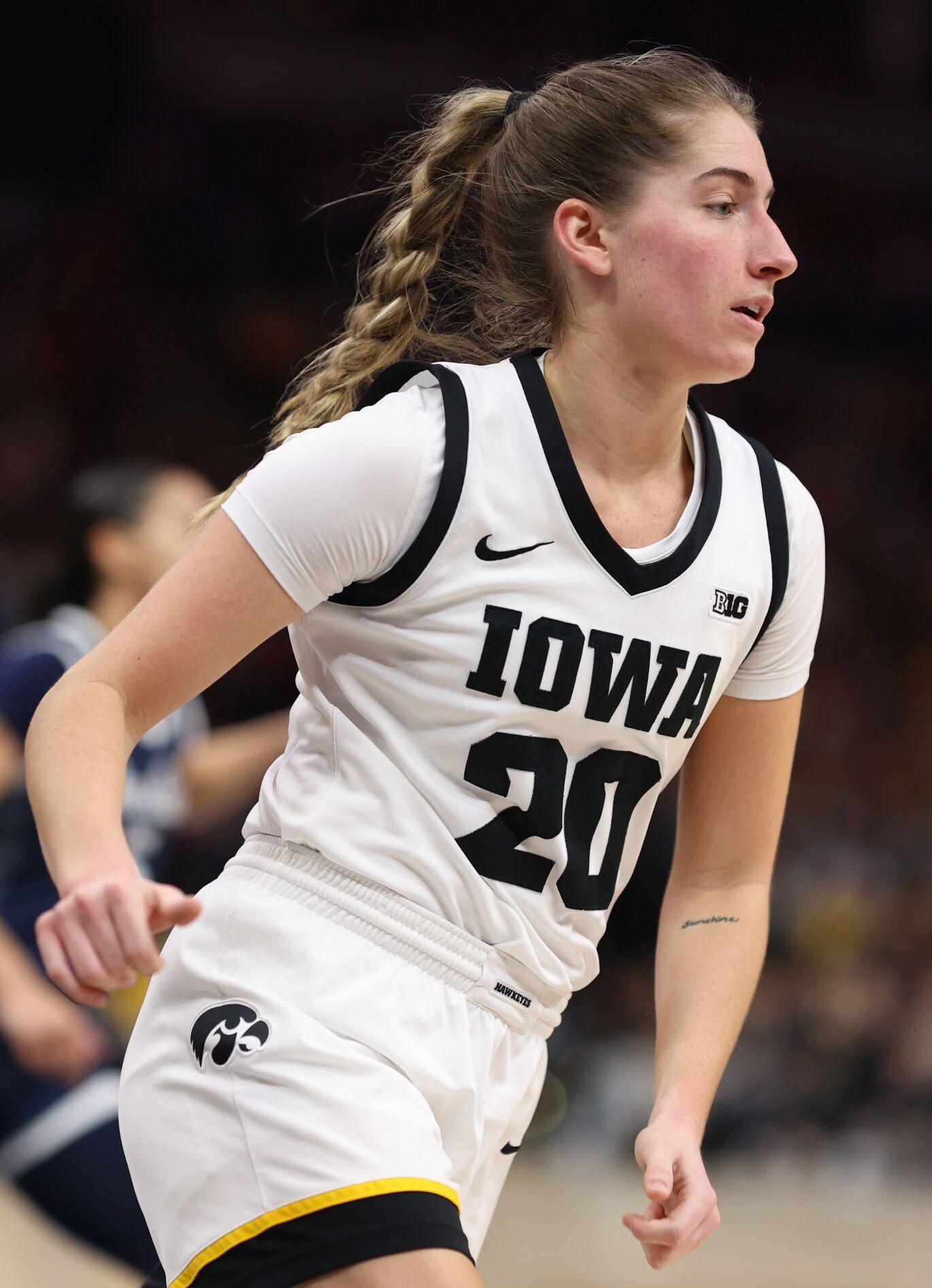
- Martin with Iowa in 2024

No. 20 – Chicago Sky
- Position: Guard
- League: WNBA

Personal information
- Born: June 5, 2000 (age 26) Edwardsville, Illinois, U.S.
- Listed height: 6 ft 0 in (1.83 m)
- Listed weight: 172 lb (78 kg)

Career information
- High school: Edwardsville (Edwardsville, Illinois)
- College: Iowa (2019–2024)
- WNBA draft: 2024: 2nd round, 18th overall pick
- Drafted by: Las Vegas Aces
- Playing career: 2024–present

Career history
- 2024: Las Vegas Aces
- 2025: Laces BC
- 2025: Golden State Valkyries
- 2026: Breeze BC
- 2026: Los Angeles Sparks
- 2026–present: Chicago Sky
- 2026–2027: Bendigo Spirit

Career highlights
- Big Ten Outstanding Sportsmanship Award (2021); Second-team All-Big Ten (2024)
- Stats at WNBA.com
- Stats at Basketball Reference

Kate Marie Martin (born June 5, 2000) is an American professional basketball player for the Chicago Sky of the Women's National Basketball Association (WNBA) and formerly the Breeze of the three-on-three league Unrivaled. She played college basketball for the Iowa Hawkeyes. The Las Vegas Aces selected her in the second round (18th overall) of the 2024 WNBA draft.

Martin attended Edwardsville High School in her hometown of Edwardsville, Illinois. Martin captained the Iowa Hawkeyes for four seasons and helped lead Iowa to their first national championship game as a senior in 2023 and helped Iowa return to the national title game the following year.

== Early life ==
Martin was born on June 5, 2000, and grew up in Granite City and Edwardsville, Illinois. She is the youngest of three children born to teachers Matt and Jill Martin. Martin started playing basketball at age five, participating in local recreational leagues and playing pickup at the YMCA. Starting in elementary school, she frequented basketball camps at University of Iowa every summer and slept with an Iowa women's basketball poster above her childhood bed. Martin also played boys' tackle football in elementary school and later took up volleyball. Her dad was one of her first coaches, coaching her and her siblings' basketball teams up until the seventh grade, as well as Martin's football team. In middle school, Martin began attending "Junior Hawk" and Iowa basketball camps every summer as a participant. In fourth grade, Martin joined her local AAU basketball program and went on to play for the Blue Star St. Louis (now known as the Napheesa Collier Elite) throughout high school. In seventh grade, Martin led her basketball team to the 2012 Illinois Elementary School Association (IESA) Class 4A state championship game, losing by three points in the final. That same year, she helped her middle school volleyball team win the 2013 seventh-grade IESA Class 4A state championship in straight sets. The following year, Martin's basketball team claimed victory at the 2013 eighth grade IESA Class 4A state championship, finishing with an undefeated 28–0 season, while her volleyball team placed third at the 2014 eighth grade state championship.

== High school ==
Martin played four years of varsity basketball for Edwardsville High School in Edwardsville, Illinois, under head coach Lori Blade. During her freshman season, Edwardsville went 30–1, winning the Southwestern Conference (SWC), regional, and sectional titles before falling to the eventual state champions, Benet Academy (and Martin's future Iowa teammate Kathleen Doyle), in the Class 4A state quarterfinals. As a freshman, Martin did not see many minutes on the court, coming off the bench and averaging 6.6 points and 3.4 rebounds per game. Her game continued to mature, and she made herself into a guaranteed starter for her remaining three years at Edwardsville. During her sophomore year in postseason play, Martin helped Edwardsville defeat Rock Island High School in the sectional championship by holding their freshman guard, Brea Beal, pointless in the first quarter. Despite Martin's 13-point contribution in the game, her team suffered a second straight state quarterfinal loss to Benet Academy, the eventual back-to-back 2016 state champions. Martin earned Class 4A All-State fourth-team accolades from the Illinois Basketball Coaches Association (IBCA).

As a junior, Martin surpassed 1,000 career points and averaged 12.9 points, 5.2 rebounds, 2.9 assists, and 2.7 steals per game. The number-one-ranked Edwardsville team finished their 2016–17 season with a 32–1 record, reaching the Class 4A state championship final where they were upset by Geneva Community High School, losing 41–40 on a last-second shot. Martin was named to the IBCA All-State Class 4A second-team and was selected as an Associated Press (AP) All-State honorable mention at the conclusion of her junior season. As a senior, Martin averaged 16.2 points, 5.9 rebounds, 2.9 assists, and 2.1 steals per game with 63.9 field-goal, 50.9 three-point, and 80 free-throw percentages. As team captain, Martin led the number-one-ranked Edwardsville team to their fourth consecutive SWC, regional, and sectional titles, and their second consecutive super-sectional championship title. Her team finished the 2017–18 season with a 30–2 record and reached their second consecutive Class 4A semifinal, ultimately finishing fourth in postseason tournament play. At the end of her senior year, Martin's class finished with an overall record of 122–6, going undefeated at home all four years. Martin led her team with the most points, rebounds, and assists during her senior season and ended her high school basketball career with the fourth-most points (1,518) in Edwardsville High School history. She received the 5th most votes for Illinois Miss Basketball 2018 award (losing the honor to Beal) and was named to both the Associated Press and the IBCA Class 4A All-State first-teams as a senior.

Martin also played four years of varsity volleyball as an outside hitter at Edwardsville. She helped lead her team to 108 wins, two SWC titles, two regional championships, and a sectional championship. She finished her high school volleyball career with a new school record for career block assists (194) and was also named to the All-SWC first-team her senior year.

=== Recruiting ===
Martin was first recruited by NCAA Division I basketball programs during her sophomore year of high school and received an offer from Bradley. During her high school career, she continued to receive offers from Division I programs including DePaul, Illinois, St. Louis, and Wisconsin, among others. During her junior year, she was recruited by Iowa (Note: As Martin's aunt, Jan Jensen, was an assistant coach for women's basketball at the University of Iowa in 2017, Jensen recused herself from Martin's recruitment process.) as a 2–3 (shooting guard/small forward). On her car ride home from her official weekend visit at Iowa, Martin called the coaching staff and verbally committed to the Hawkeyes. She announced this verbal commitment on Twitter in May 2017. Martin formally signed her letter of intent in November 2017 and received a full athletic scholarship from the university. By the end of her high school career, Martin was considered a three-star recruit with a scouting grade of 90 by ESPN. In interviews, Martin stated playing for Iowa was "always the goal" and that committing to play there was "a no-brainer". In sixth grade for an English assignment, she wrote a letter for her future self to be opened after graduating high school in which she wrote, "Hi Kate. When you're reading this, I hope you have committed to play basketball at the University of Iowa."

== College career ==
=== Redshirt year (2018–19) ===
In June 2018, it was announced that Martin had torn her left anterior cruciate ligament (ACL) and lateral meniscus in a collision during practice for the IBCA high school all-star game and would miss the entire 2018–19 season. She received an additional year of eligibility after redshirting. Iowa finished their season with a 29–7 record, won the 2019 Big Ten tournament title, and advanced to the Elite Eight in the NCAA tournament (losing to the eventual national champs, Baylor, 85–53).

=== Freshman season (2019–20) ===
On November 7, 2019, Martin made her collegiate debut in a 85–53 win over Florida Atlantic. From the bench, she played in 24 games (averaging 8.1 minutes per game). The Hawkeyes ended the year with a 23–7 record, an undefeated record on home court, and a third-place finish in the regular season in the Big Ten Conference. On March 12, 2020, the NCAA canceled the 2020 women's basketball tournament due to the COVID-19 pandemic, effectively ending the 2019–20 season.

=== Sophomore season (2020–21) ===
With the graduation of three of Iowa's 2019–20 starters, Martin moved into Iowa's starting line-up and started all 30 games alongside incoming freshman Caitlin Clark. She was also named team captain for the 2020–21 season. During the January 3 game against Illinois, Martin broke her nose after being hit in the face by a basketball and wore a protective transparent plastic mask for six weeks. She broke her nose again in early February after a practice squad player "threw a beautiful bullet pass right to [her] face", extending her mask use for a few additional weeks. In her first game back without her mask, Martin posted her first career double-double for Iowa with a career-best 19 points (going 5-for-5 on three-pointers) with 11 assists and five rebounds in a decisive 96–78 win over Penn State on February 18. At the end of the regular season, Martin averaged 30.7 minutes, 7.0 points, and 4.3 rebounds per game with a season total of 110 assists and 34 steals. Martin helped Iowa reach the Big Ten tournament championship game where they ultimately fell to Maryland in an 104–84 loss. In the first round of the 2021 NCAA tournament, Martin got off to a quick start, registering 8 points in the first six minutes in Iowa's 87–72 win over Central Michigan. Iowa went on to face number-one-seeded UConn in the Sweet Sixteen, losing to the Huskies 92–72. Martin was named to the Academic All-Big Ten team and also was selected as Iowa's women's basketball honoree for the Big Ten Sportsmanship Award and won the Iowa's 2021 Big Ten Outstanding Sportsmanship Award, alongside Mekhi Sargent.

=== Junior season (2021–22) ===
Entering her junior season, Martin again was named team captain and started all 32 games for Iowa alongside Clark, averaging 30 minutes per game. After helping Iowa earn the Big Ten regular season championship title (shared with Ohio State), Martin put on a commanding performance in the 2022 Big Ten tournament, averaging 12.3 points, 6.7 rebounds, and 6.3 assists per game in the tournament. On March 4, 2022, in the quarterfinal match-up, she recorded 15 points, six assists, and five rebounds in Iowa's 71–59 win over Northwestern. Martin grabbed a career-high 11 rebounds with eight points and five assists in the semifinal win over Nebraska on March 5. Iowa claimed the Big Ten tournament title by defeating Indiana 74–67. With this title win, Iowa automatically qualified for the 2022 NCAA tournament and was named the number two seed for the Greensboro Region. Her team was upset by 10th-seed Creighton in the second round of the NCAA tournament in a 64–62 loss. As a redshirt junior, she averaged 7.2 points, 3.5 rebounds, and 4.9 assists per game. At the end of the academic year, she was selected as Iowa's Big Ten Sportsmanship Award honoree for women's basketball for the second consecutive year, earned Academic All-Big Ten honors, was a Big Ten Distinguished Scholar (for maintaining 4.0 GPA during the academic term), and was named to the Dean's List.

=== Senior season (2022–23) ===
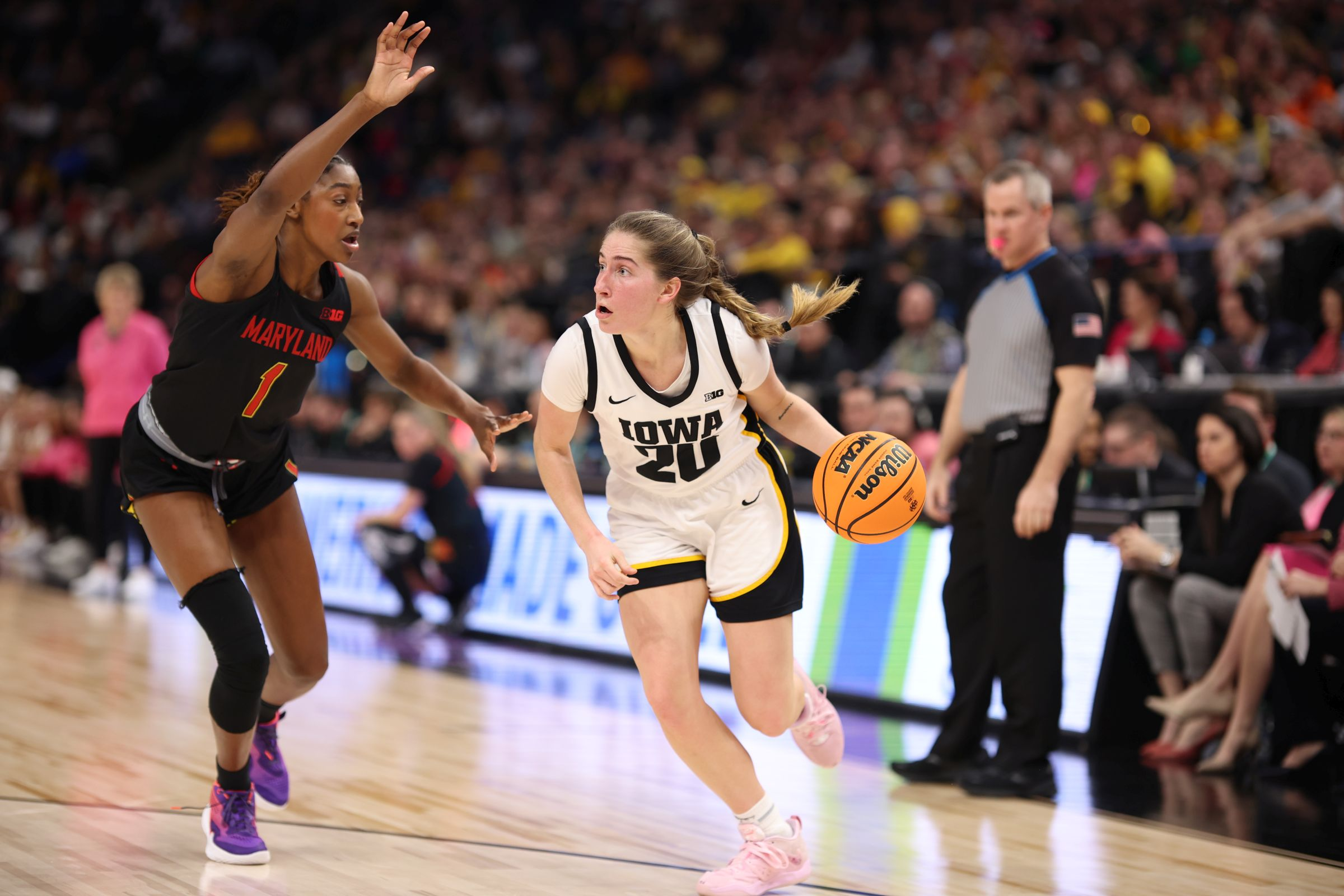
Martin driving the ball during the 2023 Big Ten tournament semifinal vs. Maryland

Martin continued her tenure as team captain and started all 38 games for the Hawkeyes beside Clark for the third consecutive season. During a preseason practice in early November, Martin was elbowed in the face by a practice squad player and broke her nose for the third time in her college career. In the November 27 game against UConn, Martin scored a career-high 20 points, going 6-for-6 on three-pointers. On December 21, as her teammate Caitlin Clark, surpassed 2,000 career points, Martin registered a career-high 13 assists during Iowa's 92–54 win over Dartmouth. She recorded her 600th career point on January 7 in a win over Michigan. A few weeks later on January 23, Iowa gave No. 2 AP-ranked Ohio State their first loss of the season, with Martin recording her first double-double of the season (13 points and 11 rebounds). On February 26 in Iowa's final regular season game against No. 2 Indiana (featured on ESPN's College GameDay), Martin contributed 19 points and 4 assists before Clark secured the victory with a game-winning three-point buzzer beater.

In the semifinal matchup against No. 5 Maryland in the 2023 Big Ten tournament, Martin tallied 10 points, nine rebounds, and seven assists, a near triple-double. She helped Iowa win their second consecutive Big Ten tournament title, handily defeating Ohio State 105–72 in the championship game. For the 2023 NCAA tournament, Iowa was named the top number two seed and competed in the Seattle regional. In the Sweet Sixteen, Iowa defeated 6th seed Colorado, 87–77, with Martin knocking down 16 points, registering six rebounds, and leading Iowa with a personal plus/minus score of +17. With their 97–83 win over Louisville in the Elite Eight, Iowa reached their first Final Four since 1993. In the Final Four matchup against South Carolina, Martin contributed seven points, seven rebounds, and two assists to Iowa's 77–73 upset win over the defending champions and the shattering of the Gamecocks' 42-game winning streak. With this win, Iowa advanced to their first women's basketball championship game in program history. Despite Martin's contribution of 13 points and six assists in the national championship game, Iowa fell to LSU, 102–85. The national championship game marked Martin's 100th career start for the Iowa Hawkeyes.

As a redshirt senior, Martin averaged 7.7 points, 4.2 rebounds, and 3.6 assists per game with a career-high field goal percentage of 46.7% and a 41.4% three-point percentage. For the third consecutive year, she was selected as Iowa's Big Ten Sportsmanship Award honoree for women's basketball.

=== Graduate year (2023–24) ===
In February 2023, Martin announced her return for a sixth and final season with Iowa, taking advantage of both her redshirt year and the NCAA's COVID-19 eligibility extension, and to complete her master's degree. In a press conference during the 2023–24 season, Caitlin Clark admitted to trying to persuade and convince Martin to return for a sixth year and went on to say, "I don't want to have to come back [and play at Iowa] if she's not here." Martin continued her reign as team captain, her fourth consecutive year leading the Hawkeyes. On October 15, 2023, she played in the Crossover at Kinnick, a preseason charity exhibition game against DePaul at the University of Iowa's Kinnick Stadium. In the game Martin contributed 11 points, 8 rebounds, and 8 assists in Iowa's 94–72 win over DePaul. Crossover at Kinnick set a new record attendance for women's basketball with 55,646 total attendees and raised ~$250,000 for the University of Iowa Children's Hospital.

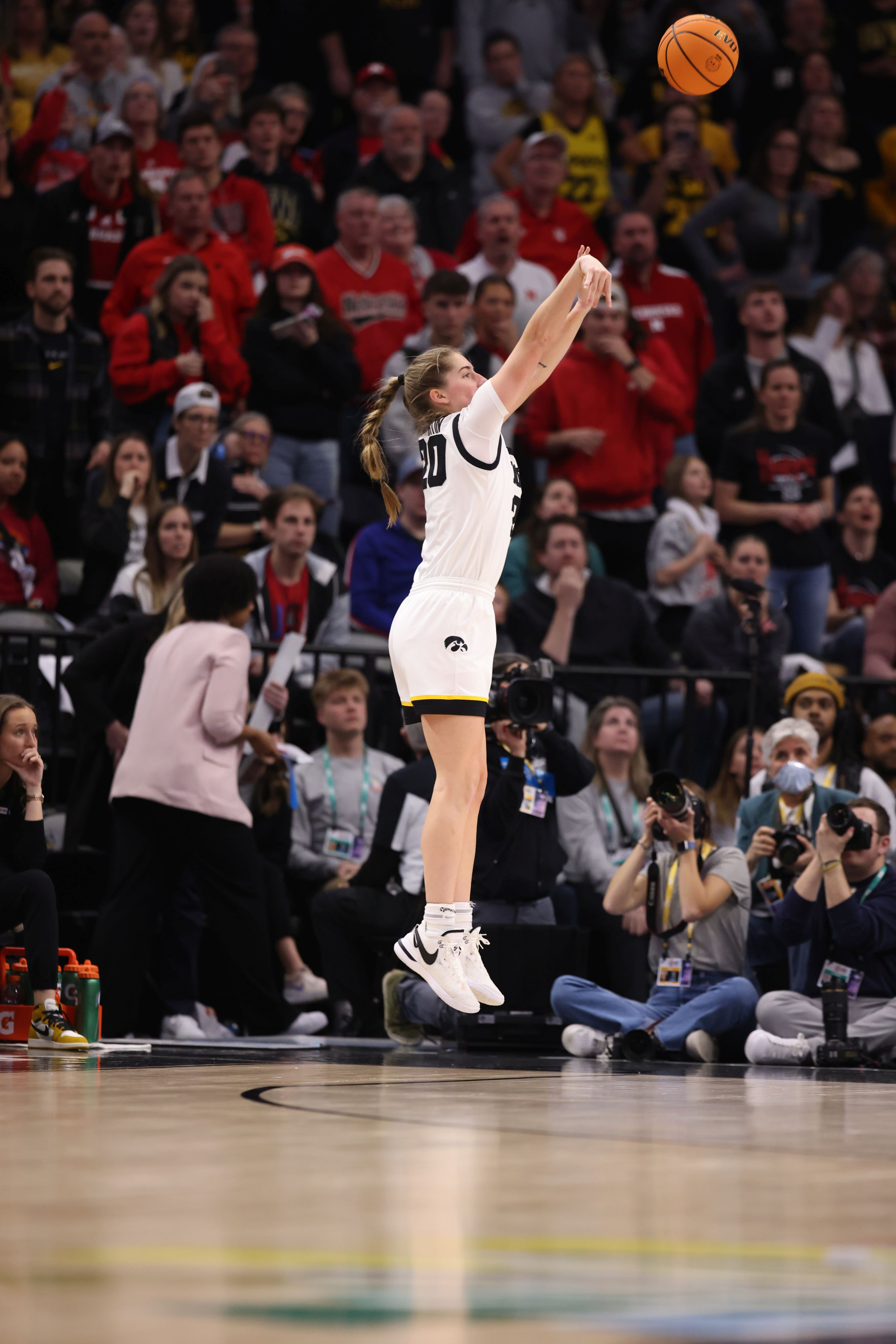
Kate Martin shooting during the 2024 Big Ten tournament final vs. Nebraska

In the third game of the regular season, Martin surpassed 500 career rebounds after grabbing eight rebounds against Northern Iowa. On November 19, Martin posted a career-high 25 points (shooting 10-of-12 from the field) to help see Iowa to a 113–90 win over Drake. Martin recorded her third career double-double against Kansas State on November 26 (11 points and 10 rebounds), and in December 2023, she became the first player in Iowa women's basketball history with 900+ points, 500+ rebounds, 400+ assists, 120+ steals, and 60+ blocks. In the snowstorm matchup against Indiana on January 13, she posted another double-double (10 points with 12 rebounds) and surpassed 1,000 career points. Martin collected her fifth and sixth career double-doubles in February: 15 points with 10 rebounds against Maryland and 16 points with a career-high 16 boards versus Penn State. During the regular season, Martin scored over 15 points in fifteen games, another career-best.

Martin led the Hawkeyes to their third straight Big Ten tournament title. In the title game against Nebraska, Martin pulled her team out of an 8-point deficit in the final three minutes of the fourth quarter, sinking two three-pointers to force the game into overtime. She drained another pair of three-pointers, resulting in a 94–89 victory over Nebraska in overtime. During Big Ten tournament play, Martin became the third Hawkeye to garner 1,200+ points, 700+ rebounds, and 450+ assists.

For the 2024 NCAA tournament, the Hawkeyes were named a No. 1 seed (Iowa's first since 1992) in the Albany 2 regional and were ranked as the tournament's 2nd overall seed. In the first round, Iowa defeated Holy Cross 91–65 with Martin collecting a double-double of 15 points and 14 rebounds, despite taking a hard hit and smacking her head against the hardwood in the first half. In the second round and her final game on home court, Martin contributed seven points and ten rebounds in a 64–54 defeat of West Virginia, putting Iowa through to the Sweet Sixteen. Iowa continued to advance in the tournament and faced a rematch of their 2023 national championship game against LSU in the Elite Eight. Martin contributed 21 points and six rebounds in the 94–87 victory over the defending champs, punching Iowa's ticket to a second straight Final Four appearance and setting a program record of 33 wins in a single season. In the final minutes of the third quarter of Iowa's Final Four meeting with UConn, Martin was elbowed in the face by forward Aaliyah Edwards and left the court with a bloody nose. Martin returned in the fourth quarter unfazed, knocking down a turnaround jump shot and a driving layup in the final minutes to pull Iowa into a two-possession lead. Iowa bested UConn in a 71–69 win with Martin posting 11 points, eight rebounds, and two steals to seal Iowa's spot in the national championship game for the second year in a row. In the title game, the Iowa Hawkeyes faced the undefeated and No. 1 overall seed South Carolina Gamecocks, a rematch of their 2023 tournament semifinal. Martin scored 16 points and collected five rebounds in her final game playing for Iowa, but the Hawkeyes ultimately suffered defeat to South Carolina in an 87–75 loss and were sent home as runners-up for the second consecutive year.

In her graduate year, Martin averaged 13.1 points, 6.8 rebounds, and 2.3 assists per game with a career-high 50.7% field goal percentage. Martin started 139 consecutive games with Caitlin Clark (the longest streak in Division I in the last 25 years) and finished her career at Iowa with 1,299 points, 756 rebounds, and 473 assists in 163 games. In February 2024, Martin was named to the Ann Meyers Drysdale USBWA Women's National Player of the Year watchlist, ultimately losing the award to her teammate Caitlin Clark. In March 2024, Martin earned second-team All-Big Ten honors from the conference's coaches and media. She was named the Big Ten Sportsmanship honoree for Iowa women's basketball for the fourth consecutive year. She was also selected for the 2023–24 Big Ten Winter Academic All-Conference team. At the University of Iowa Department of Athletics' end-of-year celebration, known as the "Golden Herkys", Martin was voted by her fellow student-athletes as the "Women's Hawkeye of the Year".

== Professional career ==
=== WNBA ===
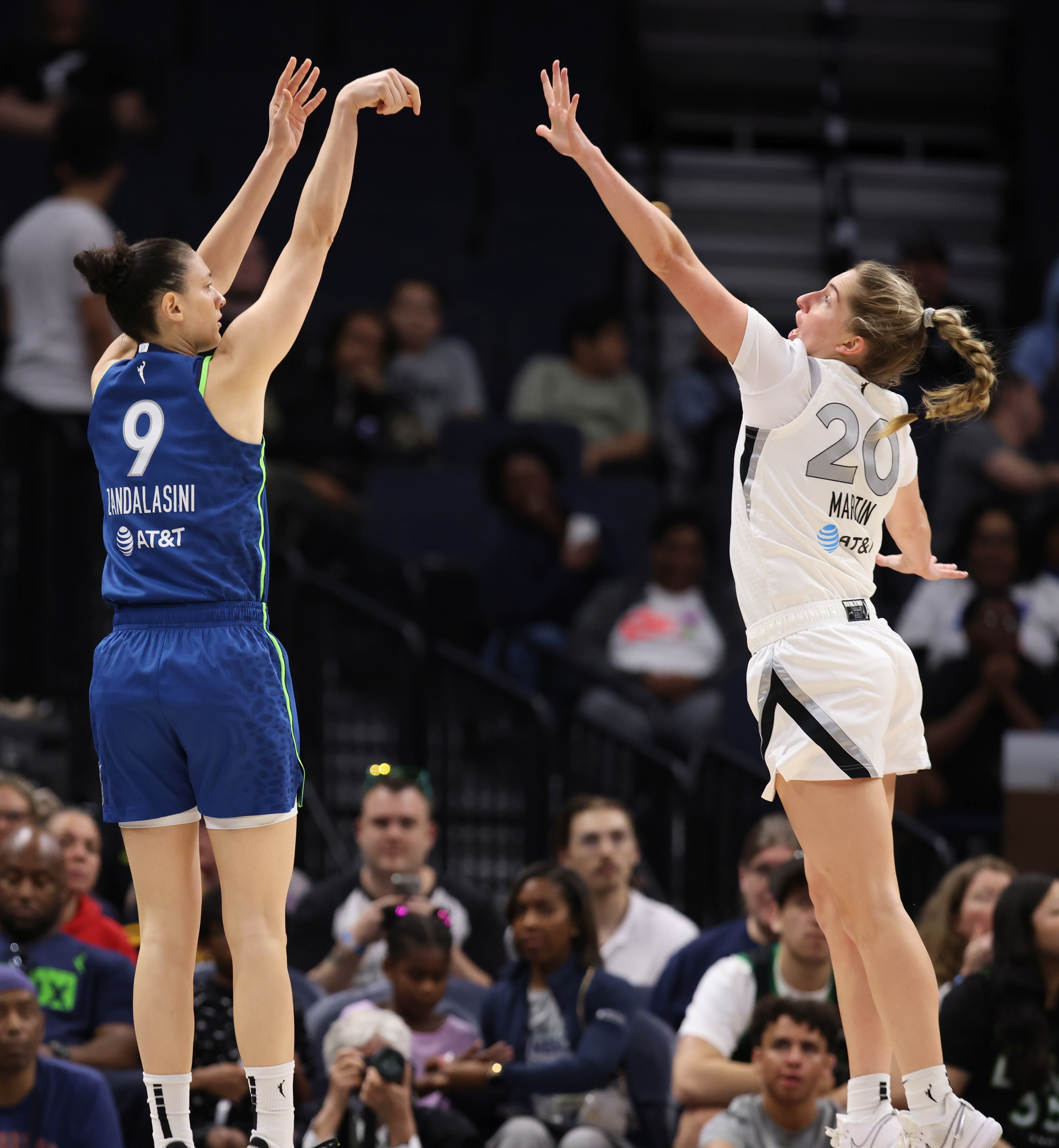
Martin (right) defends Cecilia Zandalasini in 2024

==== Las Vegas Aces (2024) ====
After completing her final season of eligibility with Iowa, Martin declared for the 2024 WNBA draft. Martin attended the ceremony in Brooklyn, New York, supporting her former Iowa teammate, Caitlin Clark, as the first overall pick. From the audience, Martin was selected in the second round as the eighteenth overall pick of the draft by the Las Vegas Aces. On April 22, 2024, Martin was signed to the Aces' rookie scale contract.

In April 2024, days after being drafted by the Aces and prior to the start of their training camp, Martin attended Kelsey Plum's second annual Dawg Class, a three-day camp to help top college guards transition from collegiate to professional basketball.

On May 13, 2024, Martin was named to the 2024 Las Vegas Aces roster. This reunited her with her former Hawkeye teammate, Megan Gustafson for the first time since 2019. Martin made her WNBA regular season debut on May 18, 2024, in an 89–82 home win against the Los Angeles Sparks, registering 3 points, three assists, five rebounds, and a block in 26 minutes played. On June 9, 2024, Martin made her first career start for the Aces against the Los Angeles Sparks, and contributed 13 points, four rebounds, and three assists in the Aces' 96-92 loss, going 5-for-7 on field goal attempts and 3-for-3 on three-pointers. Martin's playtime raised during a stretch where many Aces players struggled with injuries, with her ultimately appearing in 34 games, and later three minutes during a playoff game. Despite being a role player, Martin's jersey was one of the WNBA's best-selling.

==== Golden State Valkyries (2025) ====
On December 6, 2024, Martin was selected as the Golden State Valkyries' pick from the Las Vegas Aces' roster in the 2024 WNBA expansion draft. She recorded her WNBA career-high 21 points, 14 of which in the final quarter, in the team's narrow three-point loss to the New York Liberty on June 25, 2025. Martin was part of the Valkyries team which became the first team in WNBA history to qualify for the playoffs in their inaugural season. The Valkyries lost in the first round of the 2025 playoffs, being swept by the Minnesota Lynx. Across the 2025 season, Martin averaged 6.2 points, 2.7 rebounds and 1.0 assist per game, up from the 2.6 points and 1.6 rebounds per game she had averaged during her rookie season.

On May 7, 2026, the Golden State Valkyries announced they had waived Martin.

==== Los Angeles Sparks ====
On May 10, 2026, it was announced that Martin had signed a player development contract with the Los Angeles Sparks. On July 6, she was upgraded to a standard player contract. However, the Sparks waived Martin on August 29.

==== Chicago Sky ====
On September 2, 2026, the Chicago Sky signed Martin to a development contract.

=== Unrivaled ===
On October 28, 2024, it was announced that Martin would appear and play in the inaugural 2025 season of Unrivaled, the women's 3-on-3 basketball league founded by Napheesa Collier and Breanna Stewart. She played for the Laces in the 2025 Unrivaled season.

On November 5, 2025, it was announced that Martin had been drafted by Breeze BC for the 2026 Unrivaled season.

On August 29, 2026, Unrivaled announced that Martin would return for the 2027 season. But she came to a mutual contract termination agreement with Unrivaled before the season started.

=== WNBL ===
==== Bendigo Spirit ====
Following the 2026 WNBA season, Martin signed with the Bendigo Spirit of Australia's Women's National Basketball League (WNBL) for the remainder of the 2026–27 season. She joined the club as a replacement player for Abbey Wehrung.

== Career statistics ==
Legend
GP	Games played	GS	Games started	MPG	Minutes per game	FG%	Field goal percentage	3P%	3-point field goal percentage
FT%	Free throw percentage	RPG	Rebounds per game	APG	Assists per game	SPG	Steals per game	BPG	Blocks per game
TO	Turnovers per game	PPG	Points per game	**Bold**	Career high	°	League leader	‡	WNBA record

=== WNBA ===
==== Regular season ====
Stats current through end of 2026 season

WNBA regular season statistics
Year	Team	GP	GS	MPG	FG%	3P%	FT%	RPG	APG	SPG	BPG	TO	PPG
2024	Las Vegas	34	2	11.5	.307	**.355**	**.917**	1.6	0.9	0.2	**0.2**	0.6	2.6
2025	Golden State	**42**	**4**	**16.4**	.319	.321	.811	**2.2**	0.9	**0.3**	**0.2**	0.7	4.6
2026	Los Angeles	17	0	7.1	.371	.308	.625	1.1	0.4	0.3	**0.2**	0.2	2.3
2026	Chicago	2	0	13.0	**.667**	.500	—	0.0	**1.0**	0.0	0.0	**0.5**	**5.0**
**Career**	3 years, 4 teams	95	6	12.9	.329	.322	.787	1.9	0.8	0.3	0.2	0.6	4.2

==== Playoffs ====
WNBA playoff statistics
Year	Team	GP	GS	MPG	FG%	3P%	FT%	RPG	APG	SPG	BPG	TO	PPG
2024	Las Vegas	1	0	3.0	.000	.000	.000	0.0	0.0	0.0	0.0	**0.0**	0.0
2025	Golden State	**2**	0	**16.0**	**.400**	**.375**	**.714**	**1.5**	**1.0**	0.0	**0.5**	0.5	**8.0**
**Career**	2 years, 2 teams	3	0	11.7	.400	.375	.714	1.0	0.7	0.0	0.3	0.3	5.3

=== College ===
NCAA statistics
Year	Team	GP	GS	MPG	FG%	3P%	FT%	RPG	APG	SPG	BPG	TO	PPG
2018–19	Iowa	Did not play due to injury											
2019–20	Iowa	24	0	8.1	.328	.182	.750	1.8	0.8	0.3	0.1	**0.7**	2.4
2020–21	Iowa	30	30	**30.7**	.431	.354	.844	4.4	**4.0**	**1.2**	0.3	1.6	7.0
2021–22	Iowa	32	32	30.1	.453	.286	.740	4.9	3.5	1.1	**0.7**	1.9	7.2
2022–23	Iowa	38	38	28.3	.467	**.414**	.833	4.2	3.6	0.9	0.4	1.7	7.7
2023–24	Iowa	**39**	**39**	28.8	**.507**	.370	**.864**	**6.8**	2.3	0.9	0.5	2.0	**13.1**
**Career**		163	139	26.3	.464	.355	.824	4.6	2.9	0.9	0.4	1.6	8.0

== Off the court ==
=== Personal life ===
Martin's father, Matt Martin, played college football at Western Illinois University. She has an older sister, Kennedy, who played basketball at Truman State, and an older brother, Trevor. Martin's maternal aunt, Julie Fitzpatrick, is married to Iowa head coach, Jan Jensen. (Note: From 2000 to 2024 (which includes Martin's entire collegiate career), Jensen was an assistant coach for the University of Iowa's women's basketball team under head coach, Lisa Bluder. On May 13, 2024, Bluder announced her retirement, and Jensen was named head coach of the Iowa's women's basketball team.) Many of Martin's aunts and uncles are former college athletes: Julie Fitzpatrick played basketball for Drake (scoring over 1700 career points), Tom Fitzpatrick played football for Drake, Matt Fitzpatrick played basketball for St. Ambrose, and Mitch Martin played football for Western Illinois. From 2021 to 2024, Martin's maternal cousin, Laney Fitzpatrick, ran cross country and middle distance at the University of Iowa and interned for Iowa women's basketball operations as an undergraduate.

In May 2022, Martin completed her bachelor's degree in sports and recreation management at the University of Iowa. With the completion of her undergraduate degree, Martin began working on a Master of Arts degree in sports and recreation management at Iowa. In interviews before she was drafted by the Las Vegas Aces, Martin expressed her aspirations to coach basketball at the collegiate level. While in college at Iowa, she received numerous endorsements for her coaching aspiration and potential from Iowa teammates, Caitlin Clark and Monika Czinano, and was often called the "coach in the locker room". Martin also received high praise from Lisa Bluder, her head coach while playing at Iowa: "She's going to be an unbelievable coach. She is a tremendous leader of young women. She is able to hold people accountable...and she doesn't back down. She has the respect of everybody in the room." In February 2024, Martin was nominated by her Iowa coaches and was later named to the Women's Basketball Coaches Association's 2024 "So You Want To Be A Coach" class.

Martin grew up and went to high school with NFL defensive end, A. J. Epenesa. Martin's father was Epenesa's football and track and field coach during his time at Edwardsville High School. (Note: Martin's dad, Matt Martin, also coached NFL cornerback, Craig James, and NFL placekicker, Riley Patterson, during his coaching tenure at Edwardsville High School.)

=== Business interests ===
During her time at Iowa, Martin signed name, image, and likeness (NIL) deals with Iowa and Quad Cities businesses, including Estela's Fresh Mex, Mel Foster Co., RAYGUN, and Zimmerman Honda.

Martin is represented by Excel Sports Management, after signing with the agency in May 2024. In September 2024, Martin announced her partnership with American Eagle Outfitters on her social media platforms. In October 2024, Martin appeared in a TikTok ad campaign for TOGETHXR and Aflac alongside her Aces teammate, Sydney Colson. Martin partnered with Athleta and their "Power of She Collective" in January 2025, joining fellow female athletes Simone Biles, Katie Ledecky, and Lexie Hull. In February 2025, Martin joined Samsung's Team Galaxy social campaign.

=== In popular culture ===
Before the start of the 2021-22 college basketball season, Iowa head coach, Lisa Bluder, praised Martin's leadership as team captain and called her "The Glue" of their team. The nickname stuck with Iowa fans, and Bluder also continued to refer to Martin as "The Glue" throughout her collegiate career. In a 2022 post-game press conference Bluder said of Martin, "Kate's always been the glue—and people overlook Kate. She holds this team together. She's our captain, she's our leader, she's somebody we look to."

After the Aces' May 31, 2024 game against the Atlanta Dream, Martin was asked and suggested that her fans be called "The Martinis". The following month, RAYGUN, an Iowa-based T-shirt company, and Martin released a "Martini" fan club T-shirt.

== Filmography ==
Overview of Kate Martin television appearances
Year	Title	Role	Notes
2023	The B1G Trip	Herself	3 episodes
2024	Full Court Press	Herself	4-part docuseries
