= Gabbie Marshall =

American basketball player (born 2000)

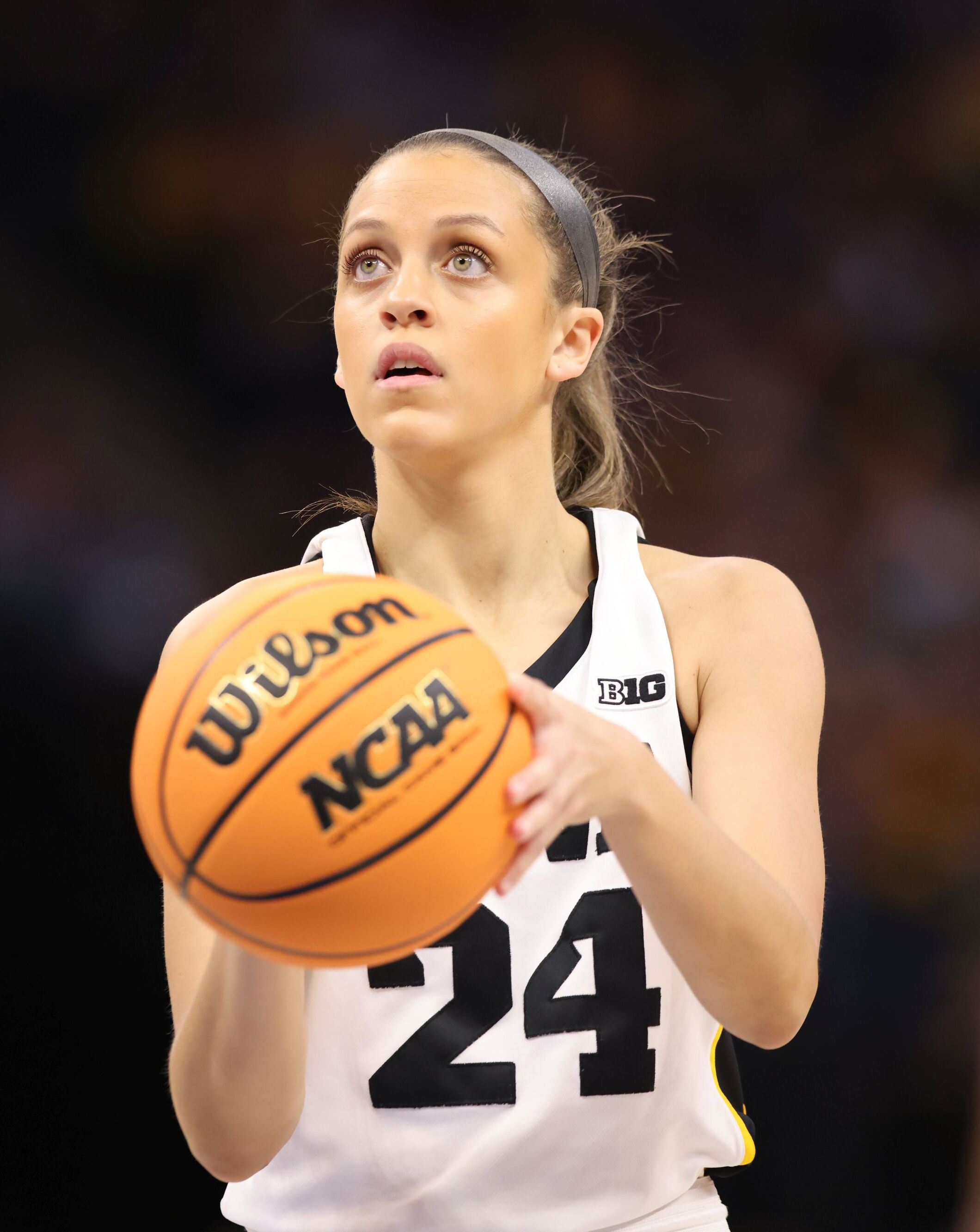
- Marshall with Iowa in 2024

Personal information
- Born: August 22, 2000 (age 25) Cincinnati, Ohio, U.S.
- Listed height: 5 ft 9 in (1.75 m)

Career information
- High school: Mount Notre Dame (Cincinnati, Ohio)
- College: Iowa (2019–2024)
- WNBA draft: 2024: undrafted
- Position: Guard
- Number: 24

Gabbie Marshall (born August 22, 2000) is an American former college basketball player for the Iowa Hawkeyes of the Big Ten Conference.

== Early life and high school career ==
Gabbie Marshall is the second eldest of three siblings born to Ernest and Marne Marshall. Her father played college basketball for Bellarmine University, her mother played at Aquinas College (Michigan). She played high school basketball at Mount Notre Dame High School in Cincinnati, Ohio. Marshall was part of the Mount Notre Dame High School team that won state titles in 2017 and 2019 , the school's seventh Ohio state title. She averaged 16 points in her high school career making her the second league scorer. She was known for being an unselfish player with an excellent defensive ability and good outside shooting skills. After her high school career, Marshall received multiple offers from schools like Dayton, Xavier and others but ultimately decided to commit to University of Iowa.

== College career ==
She made one start for Iowa but got minutes in every game as a freshman in 2019–20. She joined the starting lineup the next season. As a senior, she led the team to the 2023 NCAA title game alongside star point guard Caitlin Clark. She shot 25-for-50 from three in the 2023 postseason. She was voted team captain for her fifth season in 2023–2024. Also known for her defensive ability, she made a key block against Nebraska to help win the title game in the 2024 Big Ten tournament.

Marshall was voted as the 2023–2024 team captain by her Iowa teammates. In the 2024 Final Four matchup against the University of Connecticut, she made a key defensive stop in the closing moments.

Instead of declaring for the WNBA draft, Marshall chose to retire from the basketball and further her education.

== Personal life ==
Marshall chose to further her education at the University of North Carolina at Chapel Hill, to work towards earning her master's degree in Occupational therapy. In late 2025, Marshall announced on her social media that she would be moving to Indianapolis, where former teammate Caitlin Clark resides.

== Career statistics ==
Legend
GP	Games played	GS	Games started	MPG	Minutes per game	RPG	Rebounds per game
APG	Assists per game	SPG	Steals per game	BPG	Blocks per game	PPG	Points per game
TO	Turnovers per game	FG%	Field-goal percentage	3P%	3-point field-goal percentage	FT%	Free-throw percentage
**Bold**	Career best	°	League leader

=== College ===
Year	Team	GP	GS	MPG	FG%	3P%	FT%	RPG	APG	SPG	BPG	TO	PPG
2019–20	Iowa	30	1	16.4	39.2	37.4	70.8	0.8	1.2	0.7	0.0	**0.6**	5.0
2020–21	Iowa	30	30	30.0	**45.3**	**47.1**	**85.7**	**2.1**	**1.9**	1.9	0.1	1.1	**9.1**
2021–22	Iowa	30	30	**31.7**	41.1	39.3	75.8	1.8	**2.1**	1.7	0.1	1.1	6.8
2022–23	Iowa	**38**	**38**	29.4	39.3	37.9	63.2	1.6	1.6	1.6	0.1	0.8	6.2
2023–24	Iowa	**38**	**38**	29.9	37.6	35.7	50.0	1.2	1.6	1.2	0.1	0.6	6.1
**Career**		166	137	27.7	40.6	39.2	72.8	1.5	1.7	1.4	0.1	0.8	6.6
Statistics retrieved from Sports-Reference.

== Off the court ==
=== In popular culture ===
Marshall appeared in the closing credits on the April 13, 2024 episode of Saturday Night Live, alongside her Iowa teammates, Caitlin Clark, Kate Martin, and Jada Gyamfi, after Clark made a surprise appearance on Weekend Update.
