= 2022–23 Iowa Hawkeyes women's basketball team =

American college basketball season

2022–23 Iowa Hawkeyes women's basketball

Big Ten tournament champions

NCAA Tournament, Runner-up
- Conference: Big Ten Conference

Ranking
- Coaches: No. 2
- AP: No. 3
- Record: 31–7 (15–3 Big Ten)
- Head coach: Lisa Bluder (23rd season)
- Assistant coaches: Jan Jensen; Raina Harmon; Abby Stamp
- Home arena: Carver–Hawkeye Arena

2022–23 Big Ten women's basketball standings
	Conf.				Overall
Team	W		L	PCT	W		L	PCT
No. 2 Indiana	16	–	2	.889	28	–	4	.875
No. 3 Iowa †	15	–	3	.833	31	–	7	.816
No. 7 Maryland	15	–	3	.833	28	–	7	.800
No. 12 Ohio State	12	–	6	.667	28	–	8	.778
No. 18 Michigan	11	–	7	.611	23	–	10	.697
Illinois	11	–	7	.611	22	–	10	.688
Purdue	9	–	8	.529	19	–	11	.633
Nebraska	8	–	10	.444	18	–	15	.545
Michigan State	7	–	10	.412	16	–	14	.533
Wisconsin	6	–	12	.333	11	–	20	.355
Rutgers	5	–	13	.278	12	–	20	.375
Minnesota	4	–	14	.222	11	–	19	.367
Penn State	4	–	14	.222	14	–	17	.452
Northwestern	2	–	16	.111	9	–	21	.300
† 2023 Big Ten tournament winner As of April 2, 2023; Rankings from AP poll

The 2022–23 Iowa Hawkeyes women's basketball team represented the University of Iowa during the 2022–23 NCAA Division I women's basketball season. The Hawkeyes were led by head coach Lisa Bluder in her twenty-third season, and played their home games at Carver–Hawkeye Arena as a member of the Big Ten Conference.

After finishing second in the conference regular season standings, the Hawkeyes won the Big Ten tournament and received an automatic bid to the NCAA tournament. The team was named the top number 2 seed and competed in the Seattle regional. During the NCAA tournament they defeated Southeastern Louisiana, Georgia, Colorado and Louisville to advance to their second Final Four in program history (their first was back in since 1993). During the Final Four they stunned defending national champion South Carolina, ending the Gamecocks' 42-game win streak. Iowa advanced to their first championship game in program history. During the championship game they lost to LSU 102–85. They finished the season with a record of 31–7.

Junior Caitlin Clark was named Big Ten Player of the Year and a unanimous First-team All-American for the second time, became the first women's player in Big Ten history to sweep the National Player of the Year awards, and was selected Big Ten Female Athlete of the Year.

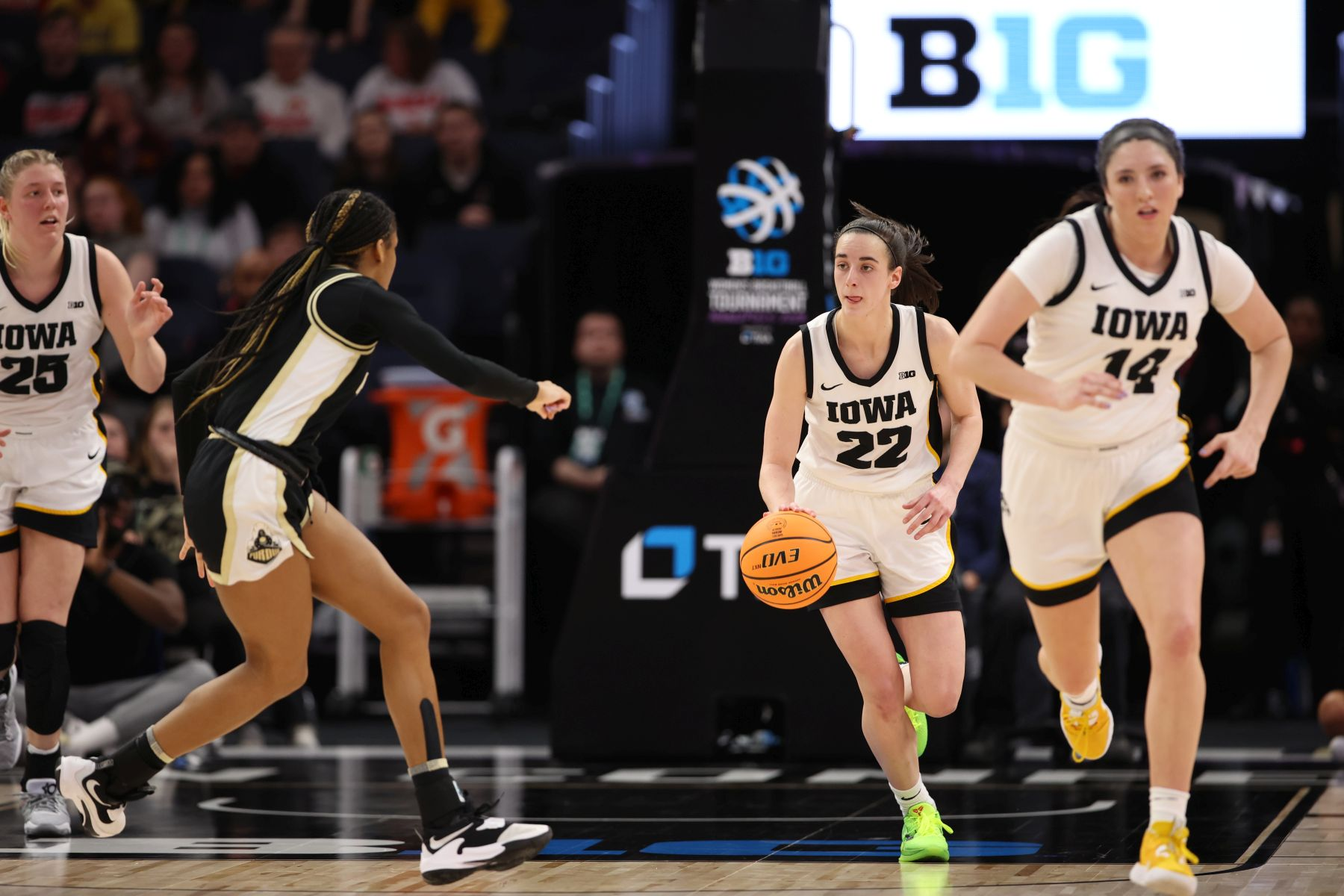
Big Ten Quarterfinals vs. Purdue

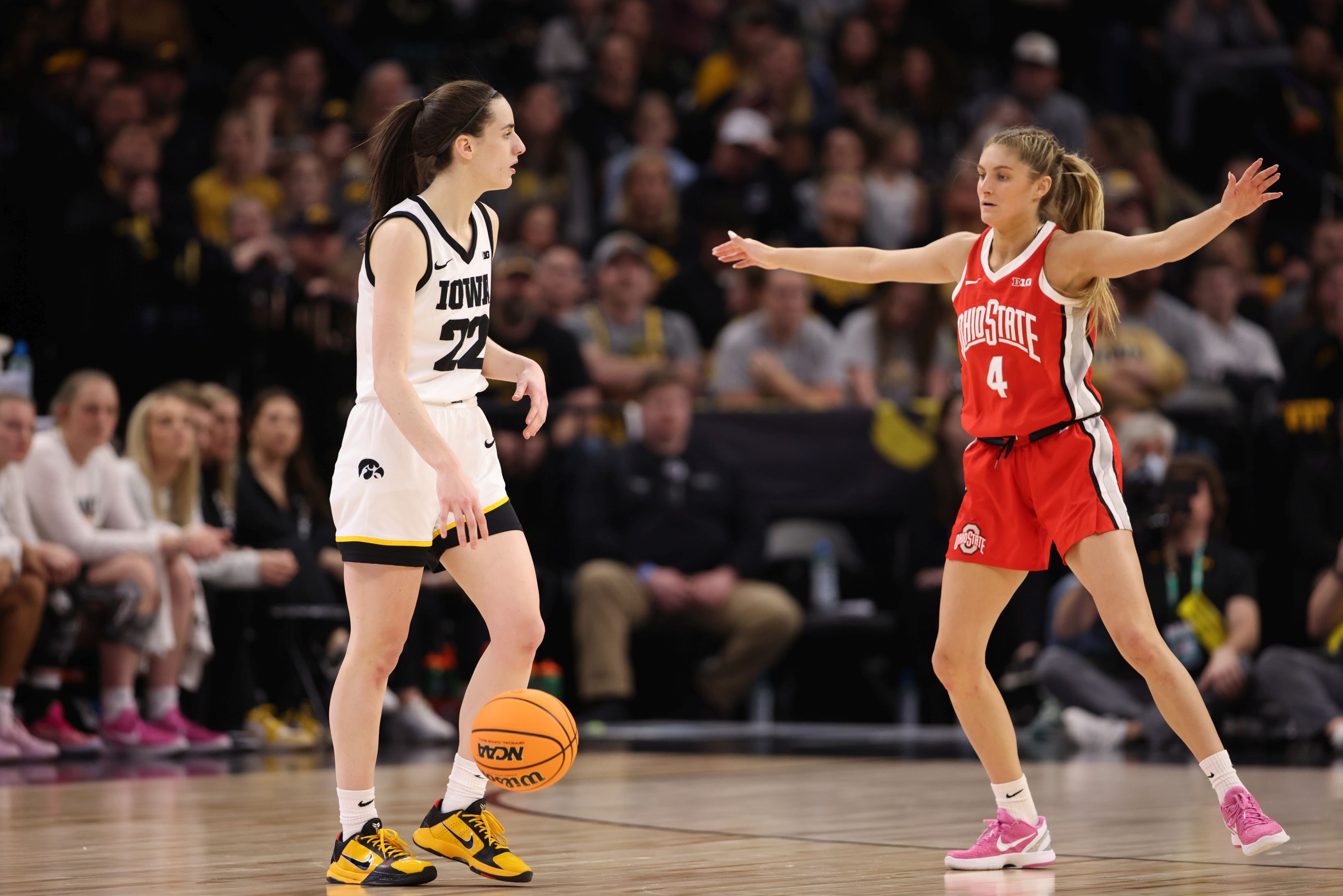
Big Ten Championship vs. Ohio State

== Previous season ==
The Hawkeyes finished the 2021–22 season with a 24–8 record, including 14–4 in Big Ten play. They won the 2022 Big Ten women's basketball tournament and earned the conference's automatic bid to the 2022 NCAA Division I Women's Basketball Tournament, where they advanced to the second round.

During the season, consensus All-American Caitlin Clark became the first woman ever to lead D-I in scoring and assists in the same season, and Monika Czinano led D-I in field-goal percentage. This made the Hawkeyes the first Division I men's or women's program to feature the national leaders in those three statistics in a single season.

== Off-season ==
=== Departures ===
Name	#	Pos.	Height	Year	Hometown	Reason for departure
Tomi Taiwo	1	G	5'10"	Senior	Carmel, IN	Graduate Transfer to TCU
Logan Cook	23	F	6'1"	Senior	Iowa City, IA	Graduate Transfer to Providence

=== Incoming transfers ===
Name	#	Pos.	Height	Year	Hometown	Previous school
Molly Davis	1	G	6'0"	Senior	Midland, MI	Transferred from Central Michigan; two years of eligibility remaining

=== Recruits ===
College recruiting
Name	Hometown	School	Height	Weight	Commit date
Hannah Stuelke; W	Cedar Rapids, IA	Washington	6 ft 2 in (1.88 m)	N/A	Mar 24, 2019
Hannah Stuelke; W	Recruit ratings: ESPN: (94)				
Jada Gyamfi; F	Johnston, IA	Johnston	6 ft 1 in (1.85 m)	N/A	Jul 21, 2020
Jada Gyamfi; F	Recruit ratings: ESPN: (92)				
Taylor McCabe; G	Fremont, NE	Fremont	5 ft 9 in (1.75 m)	N/A	Aug 3, 2020
Taylor McCabe; G	Recruit ratings: ESPN: (91)				
Overall recruit ranking:
Note: In many cases, Scout, Rivals, 247Sports, On3, and ESPN may conflict in their listings of height and weight.; In these cases, the average was taken. ESPN grades are on a 100-point scale.; Sources: "2022 Player Commits". ESPN. Archived from the original on April 24, 2024.

== Roster ==
2022–23 Iowa Hawkeyes women's basketball team
Players
Coaches

Pos.	#	Name	Height	Year	Previous school	Hometown
G	1	Molly Davis	5 ft 7 in (1.7 m)	Sr	Herbert Henry Dow/Cent. Michigan	Midland, MI
G	2	Taylor McCabe	5 ft 9 in (1.75 m)	Fr	Fremont	Fremont, NE
G	3	Sydney Affolter	5 ft 11 in (1.8 m)	So	Marist HS	Chicago, IL
G	4	Kylie Feuerbach (injured) (redshirt)	6 ft 0 in (1.83 m)	Jr	Sycamore/Iowa St.	Sycamore, IL
F	13	Shateah Wetering	6 ft 0 in (1.83 m)	RS So	Montezuma	Montezuma, IA
G/F	14	McKenna Warnock	6 ft 1 in (1.85 m)	Sr	Monona Grove	Madison, WI
G	20	Kate Martin (C)	6 ft 0 in (1.83 m)	RS Sr	Edwardsville	Edwardsville, IL
G	22	Caitlin Clark	6 ft 0 in (1.83 m)	Jr	Dowling Catholic	West Des Moines, IA
F	23	Jada Gyamfi	6 ft 1 in (1.85 m)	Fr	Johnston	Johnston, IA
G	24	Gabbie Marshall	5 ft 9 in (1.75 m)	Sr	Mount Notre Dame	Cincinnati, OH
F/C	25	Monika Czinano	6 ft 3 in (1.91 m)	Sr	Watertown-Mayer	Watertown, MN
F	34	AJ Ediger	6 ft 2 in (1.88 m)	So	Hamilton HS	Hudsonville, MI
C	40	Sharon Goodman	6 ft 3 in (1.91 m)	RS So	Crestwood	Lime Springs, IA
F/C	44	Addison O'Grady	6 ft 4 in (1.93 m)	So	Grandview	Aurora, CO
F	45	Hannah Stuelke	6 ft 2 in (1.88 m)	Fr	Washington HS	Cedar Rapids, IA

Head coach

- Lisa Bluder (Northern Iowa)

Assistant coach(es)

- Jan Jensen (Drake)
- Raina Harmon (Central Michigan)
- Abby Stamp (Iowa)

Legend

- (C) Team captain
- (S) Suspended
- (I) Ineligible
- (W) Walk-on
- Injured
- Current redshirt

Roster

== Schedule and results ==
Date time, TV	Rank^{#}	Opponent^{#}	Result	Record	High points	High rebounds	High assists	Site (attendance) city, state
Exhibition
October 28, 2022*; 6:30 pm, BTN+	No. 4	Nebraska–Kearney	W 108–29	—	18 – Tied	6 – Tied	8 – Clark	Carver–Hawkeye Arena (7,784); Iowa City, IA
Regular Season
November 7, 2022*; 8:30 pm, BTN+	No. 4	Southern	W 87–34	1–0	20 – Clark	9 – Clark	4 – Davis	Carver–Hawkeye Arena (7,417); Iowa City, IA
November 10, 2022*; 6:30 pm, BTN+	No. 4	Evansville	W 115–62	2–0	26 – Clark	8 – Tied	12 – Clark	Carver–Hawkeye Arena (7,675); Iowa City, IA
November 13, 2022*; 2:00 pm, ESPN+	No. 4	at Drake	W 92–86 ^{OT}	3–0	36 – Czinano	11 – Czinano	9 – Clark	Knapp Center (6,424); Des Moines, IA
November 17, 2022*; 8:00 pm, ESPN+	No. 4	at Kansas State	L 83–84	3–1	27 – Clark	10 – Clark	7 – Clark	Bramlage Coliseum (5,215); Manhattan, KS
November 20, 2022*; 2:00 pm, BTN+	No. 4	Belmont	W 73–62	4–1	33 – Clark	10 – Czinano	5 – Clark	Carver–Hawkeye Arena (8,227); Iowa City, IA
November 25, 2022*; 7:30 pm, ESPNU	No. 9	vs. Oregon State; Phil Knight Legacy tournament semifinals	W 73–59	5–1	28 – Clark	9 – Clark	8 – Clark	Chiles Center (2,299); Portland, OR
November 27, 2022*; 12:00 pm, ABC	No. 9	vs. No. 3 UConn; Phil Knight Legacy tournament final	L 79–86	5–2	25 – Clark	7 – Tied	6 – Clark	Moda Center (7,168); Portland, OR
December 1, 2022*; 7:30 pm, ESPN2	No. 10	No. 12 NC State; ACC–Big Ten Challenge	L 81–94	5–3	45 – Clark	9 – Czinano	4 – Clark	Carver–Hawkeye Arena (8,250); Iowa City, IA
December 4, 2022; 1:00 pm, BTN+	No. 10	at Wisconsin	W 102–71	6–3 (1–0)	22 – Clark	10 – Clark	10 – Clark	Kohl Center (3,926); Madison, WI
December 7, 2022*; 6:00 pm, ESPN2	No. 16	No. 10 Iowa State; Rivalry / Iowa Corn Cy-Hawk Series	W 70–57	7–3	19 – Clark	10 – Czinano	8 – Clark	Carver–Hawkeye Arena (13,802); Iowa City, IA
December 10, 2022; 8:00 pm, BTN	No. 16	Minnesota	W 87–64	8–3 (2–0)	32 – Clark	10 – Tied	9 – Clark	Carver–Hawkeye Arena (8,946); Iowa City, IA
December 18, 2022*; 2:00 pm, BTN+	No. 12	Northern Iowa	W 88–74	9–3	26 – Clark	8 – Clark	7 – Clark	Carver–Hawkeye Arena (13,394); Iowa City, IA
December 21, 2022*; 2:00 pm, BTN+	No. 13	Dartmouth	W 92–54	10–3	20 – Tied	10 – Clark	13 – Martin	Carver–Hawkeye Arena (8,100); Iowa City, IA
December 29, 2022; 8:00 pm, BTN	No. 12	Purdue	W 83–68	11–3 (3–0)	24 – Clark	10 – Stuelke	5 – Clark	Carver–Hawkeye Arena (11,942); Iowa City, IA
January 1, 2023; 2:00 pm, BTN	No. 12	at Illinois	L 86–90	11–4 (3–1)	32 – Clark	6 – Tied	7 – Clark	State Farm Center (4,803); Champaign, IL
January 7, 2023; 3:30 pm, FOX	No. 16	at No. 14 Michigan	W 94–85	12–4 (4–1)	28 – Clark	8 – Clark	8 – Czinano	Crisler Center (10,731); Ann Arbor, MI
January 11, 2023; 6:30 pm, BTN+	No. 12	Northwestern	W 93–64	13–4 (5–1)	20 – Clark	9 – Tied	14 – Clark	Carver–Hawkeye Arena (8,384); Iowa City, IA
January 14, 2023; 11:30 am, BTN	No. 12	Penn State	W 108–67	14–4 (6–1)	27 – Clark	10 – Warnock	10 – Clark	Carver–Hawkeye Arena (12,436); Iowa City, IA
January 18, 2023; 6:00 pm, BTN+	No. 10	at Michigan State	W 84–81 ^{OT}	15–4 (7–1)	26 – Clark	9 – Tied	11 – Clark	Breslin Center (3,359); East Lansing, MI
January 23, 2023; 6:00 pm, ESPN2	No. 10т	at No. 2 Ohio State	W 83–72	16–4 (8–1)	28 – Clark	13 – Stuelke	15 – Clark	Value City Arena (9,955); Columbus, OH
January 28, 2023; 12:00 pm, FOX	No. 10т	Nebraska	W 80–76	17–4 (9–1)	33 – Clark	12 – Clark	9 – Clark	Carver–Hawkeye Arena (13,843); Iowa City, IA
February 2, 2023; 7:30 pm, ESPN	No. 6	No. 8 Maryland	W 96–82	18–4 (10–1)	42 – Clark	7 – Clark	8 – Clark	Carver–Hawkeye Arena (10,671); Iowa City, IA
February 5, 2023; 11:00 am, BTN	No. 6	at Penn State	W 95–51	19–4 (11–1)	23 – Clark	10 – Clark	14 – Clark	Bryce Jordan Center (5,228); University Park, PA
February 9, 2023; 5:30 pm, BTN	No. 5	at No. 2 Indiana	L 78–87	19–5 (11–2)	35 – Clark	11 – Warnock	10 – Clark	Simon Skjodt Assembly Hall (13,046); Bloomington, IN
February 12, 2023; 2:00 pm, FS1	No. 5	Rutgers	W 111–57	20–5 (12–2)	17 – Davis	5 – Tied	10 – Clark	Carver–Hawkeye Arena (13,150); Iowa City, IA
February 15, 2023; 6:30 pm, BTN+	No. 7	Wisconsin	W 91–61	21–5 (13–2)	24 – Clark	7 – Stuelke	8 – Clark	Carver–Hawkeye Arena (10,512); Iowa City, IA
February 18, 2023; 1:00 pm, BTN	No. 7	at Nebraska	W 80–60	22–5 (14–2)	30 – Clark	7 – Czinano	8 – Clark	Pinnacle Bank Arena (14,289); Lincoln, NE
February 21, 2023; 7:00 pm, BTN	No. 6	at No. 7 Maryland	L 68–96	22–6 (14–3)	18 – Clark	9 – Czinano	4 – Clark	Xfinity Center (9,065); College Park, MD
February 26, 2023; 1:00 pm, ESPN	No. 6	No. 2 Indiana; College GameDay	W 86–85	23–6 (15–3)	34 – Clark	9 – Tied	9 – Clark	Carver–Hawkeye Arena (15,056); Iowa City, IA
Big Ten tournament
March 3, 2023; 6:30 pm, BTN	(2) No. 7	vs. (7) Purdue; Quarterfinals	W 69−58	24–6	22 – Clark	8 – Clark	5 – Martin	Target Center (8,577); Minneapolis, MN
March 4, 2023; 5:00 pm, BTN	(2) No. 7	vs. (3) No. 5 Maryland; Semifinals	W 89–84	25–6	22 – Clark	9 – Martin	9 – Clark	Target Center (9,375); Minneapolis, MN
March 5, 2023; 5:00 pm, ESPN	(2) No. 7	vs. (4) No. 14 Ohio State; Championship	W 105–72	26–6	30 – Clark	11 – Warnock	17 – Clark	Target Center (9,505); Minneapolis, MN
NCAA tournament
March 17, 2023; 3:00 pm, ESPN	(2 S4) No. 3	(15 S4) Southeastern Louisiana; First round	W 95–43	27–6	26 – Clark	8 – Tied	12 – Clark	Carver–Hawkeye Arena (14,382); Iowa City, IA
March 19, 2023; 2:00 pm, ABC	(2 S4) No. 3	(10 S4) Georgia; Second round	W 74–66	28–6	22 – Clark	9 – Czinano	12 – Clark	Carver–Hawkeye Arena (14,382); Iowa City, IA
March 24, 2023; 6:30 pm, ESPN	(2 S4) No. 3	vs. (6 S4) No. 21 Colorado; Sweet Sixteen	W 87–77	29–6	31 – Clark	7 – Czinano	8 – Clark	Climate Pledge Arena; Seattle, WA
March 26, 2023; 8:00 pm, ESPN	(2 S4) No. 3	vs. (5 S4) Louisville; Elite Eight	W 97–83	30–6	41 – Clark	10 – Clark	12 – Clark	Climate Pledge Arena (11,700); Seattle, WA
March 31, 2023; 8:30 pm, ESPN	(2 S4) No. 3	vs. (1 G1) No. 1 South Carolina; Final Four	W 77–73	31–6	41 – Clark	7 – Martin	8 – Clark	American Airlines Center (19,288); Dallas, TX
April 2, 2023; 2:30 pm, ABC	(2 S4) No. 3	vs. (3 G2) No. 9 LSU; National Championship	L 85–102	31–7	30 – Clark	6 – Tied	8 – Clark	American Airlines Center (19,482); Dallas, TX
*Non-conference game. ^{#}Rankings from AP Poll. (#) Tournament seedings in parentheses. S4=Seattle 4 G1=Greenville 1 G2=Greenville 2. All times are in Central Time. Source:

== Rankings ==
Ranking movements Legend: ██ Increase in ranking ██ Decrease in ranking т = Tied with team above or below
	Week																			
Poll	Pre	1	2	3	4	5	6	7	8	9	10	11	12	13	14	15	16	17	18	Final
AP	4	4	9	10	16	12	13	12	16	12	10	10т	6	5	7	6	7	2	3	Not released
Coaches	6т	6	8	10	13	11	11	10	12	9	9	8	6	6	7	6	7	3	3	2

== 2023 WNBA draft ==
Round	Pick	Player	WNBA club
3	26	Monika Czinano	Los Angeles Sparks
