= Molly Davis =

American basketball player (born 2000)

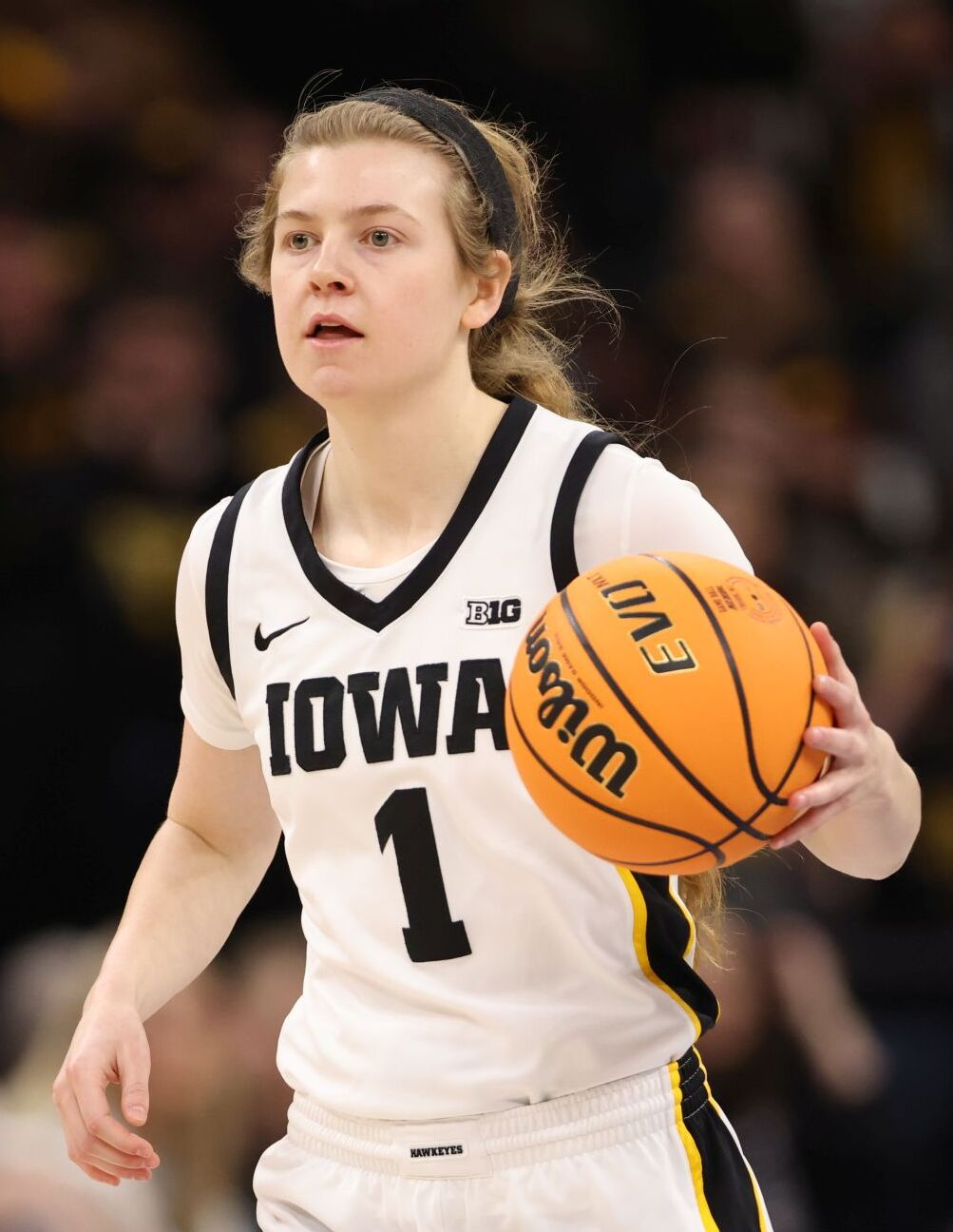
- Davis with Iowa in 2023

Evansville Purple Aces
- Position: Assistant coach
- League: Missouri Valley Conference

Personal information
- Born: August 21, 2000 (age 26) Lafayette, Indiana, U.S.
- Listed height: 5 ft 7 in (1.70 m)

Career information
- High school: H. H. Dow (Midland, Michigan)
- College: Central Michigan (2019–2022); Iowa (2022–2024)
- WNBA draft: 2024: undrafted

Career history

Coaching
- 2024–2026: Evansville (graduate assistant)
- 2026–present: Evansville (assistant)

Career highlights
- First-team All-MAC (2021); 2× Second-team All-MAC (2020, 2022); MAC All-Freshman Team (2020)

Molly Davis (born August 21, 2000) is an American former basketball player who is an assistant coach for the Evansville Purple Aces women's basketball team. She played college basketball for the Iowa Hawkeyes and Central Michigan Chippewas.

== Early life and high school career ==
Davis was born in Lafayette, Indiana, to Ted and Melinda Davis, and has an older brother, Trevor. Her father played college football for Franklin College (Indiana), and her brother played basketball for Northwood University. She played three years of high school basketball at H. H. Dow High School in Midland, Michigan, and was named second-team all-state as a sophomore. She played for the Amateur Athletic Union (AAU) team Michigan Mystics in 2017 and 2018.

Davis began wearing a headband while playing in fifth or sixth grade. Since high school she has worn the same Under Armour headband, repaired several times by her father, which became popular with Iowa fans and has its own Twitter account.

== College career ==
Davis played three seasons at Central Michigan University from 2019 to 2022. She was named to the all-MAC second team as a freshman and junior. As a sophomore, she led the Chippewas to win the 2021 MAC tournament, leading the conference with 76 three-pointers and recording a double-double in every game that season, and was named first-team all-MAC. Central Michigan lost to Iowa in Davis's only NCAA appearance at the school.

Davis transferred to Iowa in 2022. She saw few minutes in Iowa's run to the title game in the 2023 NCAA tournament. She regularly started the next season, playing as a point guard or shooting guard alongside star point guard Caitlin Clark. In her fifth year, she was named to the all-tournament team at the 2023 Gulf Coast Showcase.

== Coaching career ==
Davis joined the Evansville Purple Aces women's basketball coaching staff as a graduate assistant on June 12, 2024.

== Career statistics ==
Legend
| GP | Games played | GS | Games started | MPG | Minutes per game | RPG | Rebounds per game |
| APG | Assists per game | SPG | Steals per game | BPG | Blocks per game | PPG | Points per game |
| TO | Turnovers per game | FG% | Field-goal percentage | 3P% | 3-point field-goal percentage | FT% | Free-throw percentage |
| **Bold** | Career best | ° | League leader |

=== College ===
| Year | Team | GP | GS | MPG | FG% | 3P% | FT% | RPG | APG | SPG | BPG | TO | PPG |
|---|---|---|---|---|---|---|---|---|---|---|---|---|---|
| 2019–20 | Central Michigan | 30 | **30** | 36.3 | 48.9 | 39.5 | 71.4 | 4.3 | 4.4 | 1.3 | 0.1 | 3.5 | 14.3 |
| 2020–21 | Central Michigan | 27 | 27 | **37.9** | 49.0 | 38.0 | 82.8 | **4.7** | 3.7 | **1.7** | **0.3** | 3.5 | **20.8** |
| 2021–22 | Central Michigan | 24 | 24 | 35.9 | 39.7 | 28.0 | 81.7 | 3.8 | **4.7** | 1.3 | **0.3** | 4.0 | 18.6 |
| 2022–23 | Iowa | **38** | 2 | 16.7 | 44.7 | 31.4 | **87.5** | 1.3 | 1.7 | 0.7 | 0.2 | **1.1** | 3.8 |
| 2023–24 | Iowa | 31 | 27 | 23.5 | **53.9** | **40.7** | 85.7 | 2.5 | 3.0 | 0.7 | 0.1 | 1.2 | 5.9 |
| **Career** | | 150 | 110 | 28.9 | 46.5 | 35.1 | 80.7 | 3.2 | 3.3 | 1.1 | 0.2 | 2.5 | 11.8 |
Statistics retrieved from Sports-Reference.
