= 2022–23 Maryland Terrapins women's basketball team =

American college basketball season

2022–23 Maryland Terrapins women's basketball
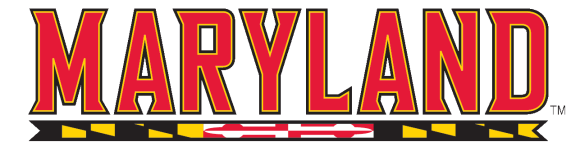

NCAA tournament, Elite Eight
- Conference: Big Ten Conference

Ranking
- Coaches: No. 5
- AP: No. 7
- Record: 28–7 (15–3 Big Ten)
- Head coach: Brenda Frese (21st season)
- Associate head coach: Karen Blair
- Assistant coaches: Kaitlynn Fratz; Lindsey Spann
- Home arena: Xfinity Center

2022–23 Big Ten women's basketball standings
	Conf.				Overall
Team	W		L	PCT	W		L	PCT
No. 2 Indiana	16	–	2	.889	28	–	4	.875
No. 3 Iowa †	15	–	3	.833	31	–	7	.816
No. 7 Maryland	15	–	3	.833	28	–	7	.800
No. 12 Ohio State	12	–	6	.667	28	–	8	.778
No. 18 Michigan	11	–	7	.611	23	–	10	.697
Illinois	11	–	7	.611	22	–	10	.688
Purdue	9	–	8	.529	19	–	11	.633
Nebraska	8	–	10	.444	18	–	15	.545
Michigan State	7	–	10	.412	16	–	14	.533
Wisconsin	6	–	12	.333	11	–	20	.355
Rutgers	5	–	13	.278	12	–	20	.375
Minnesota	4	–	14	.222	11	–	19	.367
Penn State	4	–	14	.222	14	–	17	.452
Northwestern	2	–	16	.111	9	–	21	.300
† 2023 Big Ten tournament winner As of April 2, 2023; Rankings from AP poll

The 2022–23 Maryland Terrapins women's basketball team represented the University of Maryland, College Park during the 2022–23 season. The Terrapins were led by head coach Brenda Frese in her 21st season, and played their games at the Xfinity Center as a member of the Big Ten Conference.

== Roster ==
2021–22 Maryland Terrapins women's basketball team
Players
Coaches

Pos.	#	Name	Height	Year	Previous school	Hometown
G	0	Shyanne Sellers	6 ft 2 in (1.88 m)	So	Aurora	Aurora, OH
G	1	Diamond Miller	6 ft 3 in (1.91 m)	Sr	Franklin	Somerset, NJ
G	2	Ava Sciolla	6 ft 0 in (1.83 m)	Fr	Pennsbury	Fairless Hills, PA
G	3	Lavender Briggs	6 ft 1 in (1.85 m)	Sr	Provo; Florida	Provo, UT
F	5	Brinae Alexander	5 ft 10 in (1.78 m)	Sr	Riverdale; Vanderbilt	Murfreesboro, TN
G	10	Abby Meyers	6 ft 0 in (1.83 m)	Sr	Walt Whitman; Princeton	Potomac, MD
G	11	Gia Cooke	5 ft 9 in (1.75 m)	Fr	Bishop McNamara	Clinton, MD
G	12	Elisa Pinzan	5 ft 8 in (1.73 m)	Sr	Istituto Tecnico Algarotti Venezia; South Florida	Murano, Italy
F	13	Faith Masonius	6 ft 1 in (1.85 m)	Sr	Manasquan	Spring Lake, NJ
F	14	Allie Kubek (injured)	6 ft 2 in (1.88 m)	Jr	Sanford School; Towson	Elkton, MD
G/F	15	Mila Reynolds	6 ft 3 in (1.91 m)	Fr	Washington	South Bend, IN
F	21	Emma Chardon	6 ft 2 in (1.88 m)	So	CEC André-Chavanne	Geneva, Switzerland
G	24	Bri McDaniel	5 ft 10 in (1.78 m)	Fr	Kenwood Academy	Chicago, IL
G	33	Summer Bostock (redshirt)	6 ft 1 in (1.85 m)	Fr	King's Christian Collegiate	Toronto, ON

Head coach

- Brenda Frese (Arizona)

Assistant coach(es)

- Karen Blair (SMU)
- Kaitlynn Fratz (California (PA))
- Lindsey Spann (Penn State)

Legend

- (C) Team captain
- (S) Suspended
- (I) Ineligible
- (W) Walk-on
- Injured
- Current redshirt

Roster

== Schedule and results ==
Date time, TV	Rank^{#}	Opponent^{#}	Result	Record	Site (attendance) city, state
Regular season
November 7, 2022*; 7:00 p.m., ESPN+	No. 17	at George Mason	W 88–51	1–0	EagleBank Arena (1,513); Fairfax, VA
November 11, 2022*; 6:00 p.m., ESPN2	No. 17	No. 1 South Carolina	L 56–81	1–1	Xfinity Center (9,244); College Park, MD
November 13, 2022*; 1:00 p.m., BTN+	No. 17	Fordham	W 83–76	2–1	Xfinity Center (4,052); College Park, MD
November 16, 2022*; 11:00 a.m., BTN+	No. 19	Davidson	W 70–52	3–1	Xfinity Center (8,454); College Park, MD
November 20, 2022*; 3:00 p.m., ESPN+	No. 19	at No. 17 Baylor	W 73–68	4–1	Ferrell Center (4,500); Waco, TX
November 25, 2022*; 11:00 a.m., FS2	No. 14	vs. DePaul; Fort Myers Tip-Off	L 67–76	4–2	Suncoast Credit Union Arena (325); Fort Myers, FL
November 26, 2022*; 11:30 a.m.	No. 14	vs. Towson; Fort Myers Tip-Off	W 81–70	5–2	Suncoast Credit Union Arena (365); Fort Myers, FL
November 27, 2022*; 11:30 a.m.	No. 14	vs. Pittsburgh; Fort Myers Tip-Off	W 87–63	6–2	Suncoast Credit Union Arena (323); Fort Myers, FL
December 1, 2022*; 6:30 p.m., ESPN2	No. 20	at No. 7 Notre Dame; ACC–Big Ten Women's Challenge	W 74–72	7–2	Purcell Pavilion (3,131); Notre Dame, IN
December 4, 2022; 1:00 p.m., BTN+	No. 20	Nebraska	L 67–90	7–3 (0–1)	Xfinity Center (4,321); College Park, MD
December 8, 2022; 6:30 p.m., BTN	No. 20	at Purdue	W 77–74	8–3 (1–1)	Mackey Arena (3,007); West Lafayette, IN
December 11, 2022*; 3:00 p.m., ABC	No. 20	No. 6 UConn	W 85–78	9–3	Xfinity Center (12,566); College Park, MD
December 21, 2022*; 11:00 a.m.	No. 15	at Purdue Fort Wayne	W 88–51	10–3	Hilliard Gates Sports Center (570); Fort Wayne, IN
December 30, 2022; 2:00 p.m., BTN+	No. 16	Minnesota	W 107–85	11–3 (2–1)	Xfinity Center (6,006); College Park, MD
January 2, 2023; 2:00 p.m., BTN	No. 13	at Rutgers	W 78–67	12–3 (3–1)	Jersey Mike's Arena (2,546); Piscataway, NJ
January 7, 2023; 1:00 p.m., BTN+	No. 13	Michigan State	W 94–85	13–3 (4–1)	Xfinity Center (6,494); College Park, MD
January 12, 2023; 6:30 p.m., BTN	No. 9	at No. 6 Indiana	L 61–68	13–4 (4–2)	Simon Skjodt Assembly Hall (5,789); Bloomington, IN
January 15, 2023; 1:00 p.m., BTN+	No. 9	Rutgers	W 80–56	14–4 (5–2)	Xfinity Center (6,591); College Park, MD
January 19, 2023; 7:30 p.m., BTN+	No. 11	at Wisconsin	W 77–64	15–4 (6–2)	Kohl Center (2,746); Madison, WI
January 22, 2023; 2:00 p.m., BTN+	No. 11	at Nebraska	W 69–54	16–4 (7–2)	Pinnacle Bank Arena (5,715); Lincoln, NE
January 26, 2023; 6:30 p.m., BTN	No. 10т	No. 13 Michigan	W 72–64	17–4 (8–2)	Xfinity Center (5,602); College Park, MD
January 30, 2023; 6:00 p.m., BTN	No. 8	Penn State	W 87–66	18–4 (9–2)	Xfinity Center (5,085); College Park, MD
February 2, 2023; 8:30 p.m., ESPN	No. 8	at No. 6 Iowa	L 82–96	18–5 (9–3)	Carver–Hawkeye Arena (10,671); Iowa City, IA
February 5, 2023; 4:00 p.m., ESPN2	No. 8	No. 10 Ohio State	W 90–54	19–5 (10–3)	Xfinity Center (11,167); College Park, MD
February 9, 2023; 8:30 p.m., BTN	No. 8	at Northwestern	W 79–54	20–5 (11–3)	Welsh–Ryan Arena (1,085); Evanston, IL
February 12, 2023; 1:00 p.m., BTN+	No. 8	Illinois	W 82–71	21–5 (12–3)	Xfinity Center (7,301); College Park, MD
February 18, 2023; 3:00 p.m., BTN+	No. 8	at Michigan State	W 66–61	22–5 (13–3)	Breslin Student Events Center (3,439); East Lansing, MI
February 21, 2023; 8:00 p.m., BTN	No. 7	No. 6 Iowa	W 96–68	23–5 (14–3)	Xfinity Center (9,065); College Park, MD
February 24, 2023; 6:00 p.m., BTN	No. 7	at No. 16 Ohio State	W 76–74	24–5 (15–3)	Value City Arena (8,949); Columbus, OH
Big Ten tournament
March 3, 2023; 9:00 p.m., BTN	(3) No. 5	vs. (6) Illinois; Quarterfinals	W 73–58	25–5	Target Center (8,577); Minneapolis, MN
March 4, 2023; 5:00 pm, BTN	(3) No. 5	vs. (2) No. 7 Iowa; Semifinals	L 84–89	25–6	Target Center (9,375); Minneapolis, MN
NCAA tournament
March 17, 2023; 2:30 pm, ESPNews	(2 G1) No. 7	(15 G1) Holy Cross; First round	W 93–61	26–6	Xfinity Center (4,415); College Park, MD
March 19, 2023; 5:30 pm, ESPN	(2 G1) No. 7	(7 G1) No. 25 Arizona; Second round	W 77–64	27–6	Xfinity Center; College Park, MD
March 25, 2023; 11:30 a.m., ESPN	(2 G1) No. 7	vs. (3 G1) No. 10 Notre Dame; Sweet Sixteen	W 76–59	28–6	Bon Secours Wellness Arena; Greenville, SC
March 27, 2023; 7:00 p.m., ESPN	(2 G1) No. 7	vs. (1 G1) No. 1 South Carolina; Elite Eight	L 75–86	28–7	Bon Secours Wellness Arena; Greenville, SC
*Non-conference game. ^{#}Rankings from AP Poll. (#) Tournament seedings in parentheses. G1=Greenville. All times are in Eastern.

== Rankings ==
Ranking movements Legend: ██ Increase in ranking ██ Decrease in ranking т = Tied with team above or below
	Week																				
Poll	Pre	1	2	3	4	5	6	7	8	9	10	11	12	13	14	15	16	17	18	19	Final
AP	17	17	19	14	20	20	15	15	16	13	9	11	10т	8	8	8	7	5	6	7	Not released
Coaches	18	18	21	17	21	21	19	17	17	14	11	11	11	9	8	8	8	6	7	7	5

== See also ==
- 2022–23 Maryland Terrapins men's basketball team
