= 2022–23 Michigan Wolverines women's basketball team =

Intercollegiate basketball season

2022–23 Michigan Wolverines women's basketball

Gulf Coast Showcase champions

NCAA women's tournament, Second round
- Conference: Big Ten Conference

Ranking
- Coaches: No. 23
- AP: No. 18
- Record: 23–10 (11–7 Big Ten)
- Head coach: Kim Barnes Arico (11th season)
- Assistant coaches: Valerie Nainima; Erin Batth; Harry Rafferty
- Home arena: Crisler Center

2022–23 Big Ten women's basketball standings
	Conf.				Overall
Team	W		L	PCT	W		L	PCT
No. 2 Indiana	16	–	2	.889	28	–	4	.875
No. 3 Iowa †	15	–	3	.833	31	–	7	.816
No. 7 Maryland	15	–	3	.833	28	–	7	.800
No. 12 Ohio State	12	–	6	.667	28	–	8	.778
No. 18 Michigan	11	–	7	.611	23	–	10	.697
Illinois	11	–	7	.611	22	–	10	.688
Purdue	9	–	8	.529	19	–	11	.633
Nebraska	8	–	10	.444	18	–	15	.545
Michigan State	7	–	10	.412	16	–	14	.533
Wisconsin	6	–	12	.333	11	–	20	.355
Rutgers	5	–	13	.278	12	–	20	.375
Minnesota	4	–	14	.222	11	–	19	.367
Penn State	4	–	14	.222	14	–	17	.452
Northwestern	2	–	16	.111	9	–	21	.300
† 2023 Big Ten tournament winner As of April 2, 2023; Rankings from AP poll

The 2022–23 Michigan Wolverines women's basketball team represented the University of Michigan during the 2022–23 NCAA Division I women's basketball season. The Wolverines were by head coach Kim Barnes Arico in her eleventh year, and played their home games at the Crisler Center. This season marked the program's 41st season as a member of the Big Ten Conference.

== Previous season ==
The Wolverines finished the 2021–22 season with a 25–7 record, including 13–4 in Big Ten play to finish in third place. They also reached No. 4 in the AP Poll, their highest rank ever, and were ranked the No. 3 seed in the 2022 NCAA tournament, their highest seed ever. The Wolverines advanced to the Elite Eight for the first time in program history.

== Offseason ==
On April 5, 2022, former assistant coach Carrie Moore was named the head coach for Harvard, following the retirement of longtime head coach Kathy Delaney-Smith.

== Roster ==
2022–23 Michigan Wolverines women's basketball team
Players
Coaches

Pos.	#	Name	Height	Year	Previous school	Hometown
G	3	Maddie Nolan	5 ft 9 in (1.75 m)	Sr	Zionsville	Zionsville, IN
G	5	Laila Phelia	6 ft 0 in (1.83 m)	So	Mount Notre Dame	Cincinnati, OH
G	10	Jordan Hobbs	6 ft 3 in (1.91 m)	So	Springboro	Springboro, OH
G	11	Greta Kampschroeder	6 ft 0 in (1.83 m)	So	Naperville North	Naperville, IL
G	12	Ari Wiggins	5 ft 8 in (1.73 m)	So	Heritage Christian	Indianapolis, IN
G	13	Kate Clarke	6 ft 1 in (1.85 m)	Fr	Carmel	Carmel, IN
F	20	Alyssa Crockett	6 ft 2 in (1.88 m)	Fr	Westfield	Westfield, IN
F	22	Chyra Evans	6 ft 2 in (1.88 m)	Fr	Lake Ginninderra	Newcastle, NSW
G	24	Michelle Sidor	5 ft 8 in (1.73 m)	Sr	Saddle River Day	Upper Saddle River, NJ
F	25	Whitney Sollom	6 ft 4 in (1.93 m)	Jr	Hartland	Hartland, MI
F	30	Elise Stuck	6 ft 1 in (1.85 m)	Jr	Charlevoix	Charlevoix, MI
F	32	Leigha Brown	6 ft 1 in (1.85 m)	GS	DeKalb	Noblesville, IN
F	33	Emily Kiser	6 ft 3 in (1.91 m)	GS	Noblesville	Noblesville, IN
C	34	Izabel Varejão	6 ft 4 in (1.93 m)	Sr	Neuse Christian Academy	Vitória, Brazil
F	44	Cameron Williams	6 ft 3 in (1.91 m)	Jr	Whitney Young	Chicago, IL

Head coach

- Kim Barnes Arico (Montclair State)

Assistant coach(es)

- Erin Batth (Clemson)
- Valerie Nainima (South Carolina)
- Harry Rafferty (Michigan)

Legend

- (C) Team captain
- (S) Suspended
- (I) Ineligible
- (W) Walk-on
- Injured
- Current redshirt

Roster

== Schedule and results ==
Date time, TV	Rank^{#}	Opponent^{#}	Result	Record	Site (attendance) city, state
Exhibition
November 5, 2022*; 1:00 p.m.	No. 25	Daemen	W 87–32	–	Crisler Center (850); Ann Arbor, MI
Regular season
November 9, 2022*; 6:00 p.m., BTN+	No. 25	Delaware State	W 83–30	1–0	Crisler Center (1,865); Ann Arbor, MI
November 11, 2022*; 7:00 p.m., BTN+	No. 25	Saint Francis	W 91–36	2–0	Crisler Center (2,930); Ann Arbor, MI
November 16, 2022*; 7:00 p.m., BTN+	No. 23	Western Michigan	W 99–67	3–0	Crisler Center (2,031); Ann Arbor, MI
November 20, 2022*; 2:00 p.m.	No. 23	at Fairfield	W 69–53	4–0	Total Mortgage Arena (1,026); Bridgeport, CT
November 25, 2022*; 5:00 p.m., FloHoops	No. 22	vs. Air Force; Gulf Coast Showcase quarterfinals	W 68–48	5–0	Hertz Arena (356); Estero, FL
November 26, 2022*; 7:30 p.m., FloHoops	No. 22	vs. South Florida; Gulf Coast Showcase semifinals	W 63–58	6–0	Hertz Arena (297); Estero, FL
November 27, 2022*; 7:30 p.m., FloHoops	No. 22	vs. No. 21 Baylor; Gulf Coast Showcase final	W 84–75	7–0	Hertz Arena (313); Estero, FL
December 1, 2022*; 9:00 p.m., ACCN	No. 17	at Miami (FL); ACC–Big Ten Challenge	W 76–64	8–0	Watsco Center (1,830); Coral Gables, FL
December 4, 2022; 2:00 p.m., BTN+	No. 17	Northwestern	W 77–66	9–0 (1–0)	Crisler Center (2,835); Ann Arbor, MI
December 8, 2022*; 7:00 p.m., BTN+	No. 14	Toledo	L 68–71	9–1	Crisler Center (2,798); Ann Arbor, MI
December 17, 2022*; 12:00 p.m., BTN+	No. 19	Appalachian State	W 77–49	10–1	Crisler Center (2,853); Ann Arbor, MI
December 20, 2022*; 7:00 p.m., ESPN2	No. 19	vs. No. 6 North Carolina; Jumpman Invitational	W 76–68	11–1	Spectrum Center (8,745); Charlotte, NC
December 28, 2022; 7:00 p.m., BTN	No. 14	at Nebraska	W 76–59	12–1 (2–0)	Pinnacle Bank Arena (8,150); Lincoln, NE
December 31, 2022; 1:00 p.m., BTN	No. 14	at No. 3 Ohio State; Rivalry	L 57–66	12–2 (2–1)	Value City Arena (4,038); Columbus, OH
January 3, 2023; 1:00 p.m., BTN+	No. 14	Penn State	W 82–72	13–2 (3–1)	Crisler Center (3,237); Ann Arbor, MI
January 7, 2023; 4:30 p.m., FOX	No. 14	No. 16 Iowa	L 85–94	13–3 (3–2)	Crisler Center (10,731); Ann Arbor, MI
January 10, 2023; 6:30 p.m., BTN	No. 17	at Purdue	W 80–59	14–3 (4–2)	Mackey Arena (3,473); West Lafayette, IN
January 14, 2023; 2:00 p.m., BTN+	No. 17	Michigan State; Rivalry	W 70–55	15–3 (5–2)	Crisler Center (10,534); Ann Arbor, MI
January 19, 2023; 8:30 p.m., BTN	No. 14	at Rutgers	W 81–58	16–3 (6–2)	Jersey Mike's Arena (1,105); Piscataway, NJ
January 23, 2023; 8:00 p.m., BTN	No. 13	No. 6 Indiana	L 83–92	16–4 (6–3)	Crisler Center (2,987); Ann Arbor, MI
January 26, 2023; 6:30 p.m., BTN	No. 13	at No. 10 Maryland	L 64–72	16–5 (6–4)	Xfinity Center (5,602); College Park, MD
January 29, 2023; 3:00 p.m., BTN+	No. 13	at Minnesota	W 77–41	17–5 (7–4)	Williams Arena (4,545); Minneapolis, MN
February 2, 2023; 6:30 p.m., BTN	No. 18	Illinois	W 74–57	18–5 (8–4)	Crisler Center (2,676); Ann Arbor, MI
February 5, 2023; 3:00 p.m., BTN+	No. 18	at Michigan State; Rivalry	W 77–67	19–5 (9–4)	Breslin Center (9,220); East Lansing, MI
February 12, 2023; 1:00 p.m., BTN+	No. 12	Nebraska	W 80–75	20–5 (10–4)	Crisler Center (4,313); Ann Arbor, MI
February 16, 2023; 8:30 p.m., BTN	No. 12	at No. 2 Indiana	L 52–68	20–6 (10–5)	Simon Skjodt Assembly Hall (7,446); Bloomington, IN
February 20, 2023; 7:00 p.m., FS1	No. 12	No. 16 Ohio State; Rivalry	L 61–74	20–7 (10–6)	Crisler Center (5,832); Ann Arbor, MI
February 23, 2022; 7:00 p.m., BTN+	No. 12	Rutgers	W 71–53	21–7 (11–6)	Crisler Center (2,402); Ann Arbor, MI
February 26, 2022; 2:00 p.m., BTN/BTN+	No. 12	at Wisconsin	L 70–78	21–8 (11–7)	Kohl Center (4,933); Madison, WI
Big Ten Women's Tournament
March 2, 2023; 3:00 p.m., BTN	(5) No. 17	vs. (13) Penn State; Second round	W 63–61	22–8	Target Center (4,908); Minneapolis, MN
March 3, 2023; 3:00 p.m., BTN	(5) No. 17	vs. (4) No. 14 Ohio State; Quarterfinals/Rivalry	L 79–81	22–9	Target Center (5,544); Minneapolis, MN
NCAA Women's Tournament
March 17, 2023; 3:00 p.m., ESPNU	(6 G2) No. 18	vs. (11 G2) No. 22 UNLV; First round	W 71–59	23–9	Pete Maravich Assembly Center; Baton Rouge, LA
March 19, 2023; 7:30 p.m., ESPN	(6 G2) No. 18	at (3 G2) No. 9 LSU; Second round	L 42–66	23–10	Pete Maravich Assembly Center (10,108); Baton Rouge, LA
*Non-conference game. ^{#}Rankings from AP Poll. (#) Tournament seedings in parentheses. G2=Greenville 2. All times are in Eastern Time. Source:

== Rankings ==
Ranking movement Legend: ██ Increase in ranking. ██ Decrease in ranking. NR = Not ranked. RV = Received votes.
Poll	Pre	Wk 2	Wk 3	Wk 4	Wk 5	Wk 6	Wk 7	Wk 8	Wk 9	Wk 10	Wk 11	Wk 12	Wk 13	Wk 14	Wk 15	Wk 16	Wk 17	Wk 18	Wk 19	Final
AP	25	23	22	17	14	19	19	14	14	17	14	13	18	12	12	12	17	18	18	
Coaches	23	23	23	20	16	21	21	19	19	20	16	17	19	14	13	17	18	18	18	23
