= 2022–23 Ohio State Buckeyes women's basketball team =

American college basketball season

2022–23 Ohio State Buckeyes women's basketball

NCAA tournament, Elite Eight
- Conference: Big Ten Conference

Ranking
- Coaches: No. 6
- AP: No. 12
- Record: 28–8 (12–6 Big Ten)
- Head coach: Kevin McGuff (10th season)
- Associate head coach: Carla Morrow
- Assistant coaches: Wesley Brooks; Jalen Powell
- Home arena: Value City Arena; Covelli Center

2022–23 Big Ten women's basketball standings
	Conf.				Overall
Team	W		L	PCT	W		L	PCT
No. 2 Indiana	16	–	2	.889	28	–	4	.875
No. 3 Iowa †	15	–	3	.833	31	–	7	.816
No. 7 Maryland	15	–	3	.833	28	–	7	.800
No. 12 Ohio State	12	–	6	.667	28	–	8	.778
No. 18 Michigan	11	–	7	.611	23	–	10	.697
Illinois	11	–	7	.611	22	–	10	.688
Purdue	9	–	8	.529	19	–	11	.633
Nebraska	8	–	10	.444	18	–	15	.545
Michigan State	7	–	10	.412	16	–	14	.533
Wisconsin	6	–	12	.333	11	–	20	.355
Rutgers	5	–	13	.278	12	–	20	.375
Minnesota	4	–	14	.222	11	–	19	.367
Penn State	4	–	14	.222	14	–	17	.452
Northwestern	2	–	16	.111	9	–	21	.300
† 2023 Big Ten tournament winner As of April 2, 2023; Rankings from AP poll

The 2022–23 Ohio State Buckeyes women's basketball team represented Ohio State University during the 2022–23 NCAA Division I women's basketball season. The Buckeyes were led by head coach Kevin McGuff in his tenth year, and played their games at Value City Arena and at the Covelli Center as a member of the Big Ten Conference.

== Roster ==
2022–23 Ohio State Buckeyes women's basketball team
Players
Coaches

Pos.	#	Name	Height	Year	Previous school	Hometown
G	0	Madison Greene	5 ft 8 in (1.73 m)	RS Jr	Pickerington Central	Pickerington, OH
G	1	Rikki Harris	5 ft 10 in (1.78 m)	RS Jr	North Central	Indianapolis, IN
G/F	2	Taylor Thierry	6 ft 0 in (1.83 m)	So	Laurel	Cleveland, OH
G	3	Hevynne Bristow	6 ft 1 in (1.85 m)	Sr	Brooklyn Community; Providence	Brooklyn, NY
G	4	Jacy Sheldon	5 ft 10 in (1.78 m)	Sr	Dublin Coffman	Dublin, OH
G	5	Emma Shumate	6 ft 1 in (1.85 m)	RS Fr	Newark; West Virginia	Dresden, OH
G	11	Kaia Henderson	6 ft 1 in (1.85 m)	Fr	New Hartford Sr	Utica, NY
G	12	Mya Perry	5 ft 9 in (1.75 m)	Fr	Reynoldsburg	Reynoldsburg, OH
F	15	Karla Vres	6 ft 3 in (1.91 m)	Sr	JENSEN gymnasium Södra (Sweden); American	Zagreb, Croatia
G	20	Kaitlyn Costner	5 ft 8 in (1.73 m)	So	Elkhart Central	Osceola, IN
F	22	Eboni Walker	6 ft 0 in (1.83 m)	Sr	Centennial; Syracuse	Las Vegas, NV
F	23	Rebeka Mikulášiková	6 ft 4 in (1.93 m)	Sr	Piaristické Gymnasium	Nitra, Slovakia
G	24	Taylor Mikesell	5 ft 11 in (1.8 m)	Sr	Jackson; Oregon	Massillon, OH
F	32	Cotie McMahon	6 ft 0 in (1.83 m)	Fr	Centerville	Centerville, OH

Head coach

- Kevin McGuff (Saint Joseph's (IN))

Assistant coach(es)

- Carla Morrow (Tulsa)
- Wesley Brooks (West Virginia)
- Jalen Powell (Mississippi)

Legend

- (C) Team captain
- (S) Suspended
- (I) Ineligible
- (W) Walk-on
- Injured
- Current redshirt

Roster

== Schedule and results ==
Date time, TV	Rank^{#}	Opponent^{#}	Result	Record	Site (attendance) city, state
Exhibition
October 31, 2022*; 6:00 p.m.	No. 14	Notre Dame College	W 118–33		Value City Arena (2,300); Columbus, OH
Regular season
November 8, 2022*; 8:30 p.m., BTN	No. 14	No. 5 Tennessee	W 87–75	1–0	Value City Arena (6,402); Columbus, OH
November 13, 2022*; 4:00 p.m., ACCN	No. 14	at Boston College	W 82–64	2–0	Conte Forum (1,022); Chestnut Hill, MA
November 17, 2022*; 7:00 p.m., ESPN+	No. 8	at Ohio	W 86–56	3–0	Convocation Center (4,285); Athens, OH
November 20, 2022*; 1:00 p.m., BTN+	No. 8	McNeese State	W 99–43	4–0	Value City Arena (3,351); Columbus, OH
November 23, 2022*; 3:00 p.m., BTN+	No. 4	Wright State	W 105–52	5–0	Value City Arena (4,208); Columbus, OH
November 27, 2022*; 1:00 p.m., BTN+	No. 4	North Alabama	W 105–67	6–0	Value City Arena (3,694); Columbus, OH
November 30, 2022*; 7:30 p.m., ACCN	No. 4	at No. 18 Louisville; ACC–Big Ten Women's Challenge	W 96–77	7–0	KFC Yum! Center (8,259); Louisville, KY
December 4, 2022; 12:00 p.m., BTN	No. 4	at Rutgers	W 82–70	8–0 (1–0)	Jersey Mike's Arena (2,649); Piscataway, NJ
December 8, 2022*; 11:00 a.m.	No. 3	New Hampshire	W 92–36	9–0	Value City Arena (6,857); Columbus, OH
December 11, 2022; 4:00 p.m., BTN	No. 3	Michigan State	W 74–68	10–0 (2–0)	Value City Arena (6,979); Columbus, OH
December 16, 2022*; 6:00 p.m.	No. 3	Albany	W 82–57	11–0	Value City Arena (3,616); Columbus, OH
December 20, 2022*; 6:30 p.m.	No. 3	vs. South Florida; San Diego Invitational semifinals	W 88–86 ^{OT}	12–0	Pechanga Arena (318); San Diego, CA
December 21, 2022*; 6:30 p.m.	No. 3	vs. No. 16 Oregon; San Diego Invitational championship	W 84–67	13–0	Pechanga Arena (378); San Diego, CA
December 28, 2022; 9:00 p.m., BTN	No. 3	at Northwestern	W 81–48	14–0 (3–0)	Welsh–Ryan Arena (1,372); Evanston, IL
December 31, 2022; 1:00 p.m., BTN	No. 3	No. 14 Michigan; Rivalry	W 66–57	15–0 (4–0)	Covelli Center (4,038); Columbus, OH
January 5, 2023; 8:00 p.m.	No. 3	at Minnesota	W 83–71	16–0 (5–0)	Williams Arena (2,410); Minneapolis, MN
January 8, 2023; 1:00 p.m.	No. 3	Illinois	W 87–81	17–0 (6–0)	Value City Arena (6,273); Columbus, OH
January 14, 2023; 2:30 p.m., BTN	No. 3	at Nebraska	W 76–67	18–0 (7–0)	Pinnacle Bank Arena (5,879); Lincoln, NE
January 19, 2023; 6:30 p.m., BTN	No. 2	Northwestern	W 84–54	19–0 (8–0)	Value City Arena (4,698); Columbus, OH
January 23, 2023; 7:00 p.m., ESPN2	No. 2	No. 10т Iowa	L 72–83	19–1 (8–1)	Value City Arena (9,955); Columbus, OH
January 26, 2023; 8:30 p.m., BTN	No. 2	at No. 6 Indiana	L 65–78	19–2 (8–2)	Simon Skjodt Assembly Hall (10,455); Bloomington, IN
January 29, 2023; 1:00 p.m.	No. 2	Purdue	L 65–73	19–3 (8–3)	Value City Arena (8,664); Columbus, OH
February 1, 2023; 7:30 p.m.	No. 10	at Wisconsin	W 90–67	20–3 (9–3)	Kohl Center (2,890); Madison, WI
February 5, 2023; 4:00 p.m., ESPN2	No. 10	at No. 8 Maryland	L 54–90	20–4 (9–4)	Xfinity Center (11,167); College Park, MD
February 8, 2023; 7:00 p.m.	No. 13	Minnesota	W 93–63	21–4 (10–4)	Value City Arena (4,357); Columbus, OH
February 13, 2023; 7:00 p.m., BTN	No. 13	No. 2 Indiana	L 59–83	21–5 (10–5)	Value City Arena (7,178); Columbus, OH
February 16, 2023; 7:00 p.m.	No. 13	at Penn State	W 67–55	22–5 (11–5)	Bryce Jordan Center (2,306); University Park, PA
February 20, 2023; 7:00 p.m., FS1	No. 16	at No. 12 Michigan; Rivalry	W 74–61	23–5 (12–5)	Crisler Center (5,832); Ann Arbor, MI
February 24, 2023; 6:00 p.m., BTN	No. 16	No. 7 Maryland	L 74–76	23–6 (12–6)	Value City Arena (8,949); Columbus, OH
Big Ten Women's Tournament
March 3, 2023; 3:00 p.m., BTN	(4) No. 14	vs. (5) No. 17 Michigan; Quarterfinals	W 81–79	24–6	Target Center (5,544); Minneapolis, MN
March 4, 2023; 2:30 pm, BTN	(4) No. 14	vs. (1) No. 2 Indiana; Semifinals	W 79–75	25–6	Target Center; Minneapolis, MN
March 5, 2023; 5:00 pm, ESPN	(4) No. 14	vs. (2) No. 7 Iowa; Championship	L 72–105	25–7	Target Center (9,505); Minneapolis, MN
NCAA Women's Tournament
March 18, 2023; 1:30 p.m., ESPN2	(3 S3) No. 12	(14 S3) James Madison; First round	W 80–66	26–7	Value City Arena; Columbus, OH
March 20, 2023; 4:00 p.m., ESPN	(3 S3) No. 12	(6 S3) No. 20 North Carolina; Second round	W 71–69	27–7	Value City Arena (5,186); Columbus, OH
March 25, 2023; 4:00 p.m., ABC	(3 S3) No. 12	vs. (2 S3) No. 6 UConn; Sweet Sixteen	W 73–61	28–7	Climate Pledge Arena; Seattle, WA
March 27, 2023; 9:00 p.m., ESPN	(3 S3) No. 12	vs. (1 S3) No. 4 Virginia Tech; Elite Eight	L 74–84	28–8	Climate Pledge Arena (8,466); Seattle, WA
*Non-conference game. ^{#}Rankings from AP Poll. (#) Tournament seedings in parentheses. S3=Seattle 3. All times are in Eastern.

== Rankings ==
Ranking movements Legend: ██ Increase in ranking ██ Decrease in ranking
	Week																				
Poll	Pre	1	2	3	4	5	6	7	8	9	10	11	12	13	14	15	16	17	18	19	Final
AP	14	14	8	4	4	3	3	3	3	3	3	2	2	10	13	13	16	14	12	12	Not released
Coaches	15	15	10	6	5	4	4	4	4	3	3	2	5	10	12	14	13	14	13	12	6

== See also ==
- 2022–23 Ohio State Buckeyes men's basketball team
