= 2022–23 Indiana Hoosiers women's basketball team =

American college basketball season

2022–23 Indiana Hoosiers women's basketball

Big Ten regular season champions

NCAA Tournament, Second round
- Conference: Big Ten Conference

Ranking
- Coaches: No. 7
- AP: No. 2
- Record: 28–4 (16–2 Big Ten)
- Head coach: Teri Moren (9th season)
- Assistant coaches: Rhet Wierzba; Glenn Box; Linda Sayavongchanh
- Home arena: Simon Skjodt Assembly Hall

2022–23 Big Ten women's basketball standings
	Conf.				Overall
Team	W		L	PCT	W		L	PCT
No. 2 Indiana	16	–	2	.889	28	–	4	.875
No. 3 Iowa †	15	–	3	.833	31	–	7	.816
No. 7 Maryland	15	–	3	.833	28	–	7	.800
No. 12 Ohio State	12	–	6	.667	28	–	8	.778
No. 18 Michigan	11	–	7	.611	23	–	10	.697
Illinois	11	–	7	.611	22	–	10	.688
Purdue	9	–	8	.529	19	–	11	.633
Nebraska	8	–	10	.444	18	–	15	.545
Michigan State	7	–	10	.412	16	–	14	.533
Wisconsin	6	–	12	.333	11	–	20	.355
Rutgers	5	–	13	.278	12	–	20	.375
Minnesota	4	–	14	.222	11	–	19	.367
Penn State	4	–	14	.222	14	–	17	.452
Northwestern	2	–	16	.111	9	–	21	.300
† 2023 Big Ten tournament winner As of April 2, 2023; Rankings from AP poll

The 2022–23 Indiana Hoosiers women's basketball team represented the Indiana University Bloomington during the 2022–23 NCAA Division I women's basketball season. The Hoosiers were led by head coach Teri Moren in her ninth season, and played their home games at the Simon Skjodt Assembly Hall as a member of the Big Ten Conference.

== Previous season ==
The Hoosiers finished the 2021–22 season with a 24–9 record, including 11–5 in Big Ten play to finish in fifth place in the conference. They received an at-large bid to the 2022 NCAA Division I Women's Basketball Tournament, where they advanced to the Sweet Sixteen.

== Roster ==
2022–23 Indiana Hoosiers women's basketball team
Players
Coaches

Pos.	#	Name	Height	Year	Previous school	Hometown
G	1	Lexus Bargesser	5 ft 9 in (1.75 m)	Fr	Grass Lake	Grass Lake, MI
G	3	Kaitlin Peterson	5 ft 9 in (1.75 m)	So	Eufaula	Eufaula, AL
G	12	Yarden Garzon	6 ft 3 in (1.91 m)	Fr	Ostrovsky	Ra'anana, Israel
G	14	Sara Scalia	5 ft 10 in (1.78 m)	Sr	Stillwater; Minnesota	Stillwater, MN
G	21	Henna Sandvik	6 ft 0 in (1.83 m)	Fr	Mäkelänrinne	Helsinki, Finland
G	22	Chloe Moore-McNeil	5 ft 11 in (1.8 m)	Jr	Greenfield	Sharon, TN
F	23	Kiandra Brown	6 ft 2 in (1.88 m)	Jr	St. Laurent	Montreal, QC, Canada
F	24	Mona Zaric	6 ft 2 in (1.88 m)	So	Novi Sad, Serbia
C	25	Arielle Wisne	6 ft 5 in (1.96 m)	RS Jr	Horizon	Thornton, CO
F	32	Alyssa Geary	6 ft 4 in (1.93 m)	GS	Nazareth Academy; Providence	Elmhurst, IL
G	33	Sydney Parrish	6 ft 2 in (1.88 m)	Jr	Hamilton Southeastern; Oregon	Fishers, IN
G	34	Grace Berger	6 ft 0 in (1.83 m)	GS	Sacred Heart	Louisville, KY
F	52	Lilly Meister	6 ft 3 in (1.91 m)	Fr	John Marshall	Rochester, MN
F	54	Mackenzie Holmes	6 ft 3 in (1.91 m)	Sr	Gorham	Gorham, ME

Head coach

- Teri Moren (Purdue)

Assistant coach(es)

- Rhet Wierzba (Austin Peay)
- Glenn Box (Southeast Missouri State)
- Linda Sayavongchanh (Drake)

Legend

- (C) Team captain
- (S) Suspended
- (I) Ineligible
- (W) Walk-on
- Injured
- Current redshirt

Roster
Last update: November 14, 2022

== Schedule and results ==
Date time, TV	Rank^{#}	Opponent^{#}	Result	Record	Site (attendance) city, state
Exhibition
November 4, 2022*; 7:00 pm	No. 11	Kentucky Wesleyan	W 86–43	–	Simon Skjodt Assembly Hall (2,200); Bloomington, IN
Regular Season
November 8, 2022*; 7:00 pm, BTN+	No. 11	Vermont	W 86–49	1–0	Simon Skjodt Assembly Hall (4,003); Bloomington, IN
November 11, 2022*; 5:00 pm, BTN+	No. 11	UMass Lowell	W 93–37	2–0	Simon Skjodt Assembly Hall (4,125); Bloomington, IN
November 14, 2022*; 6:00 pm, ESPN2	No. 12	at No. 11 Tennessee	W 79–67	3–0	Thompson–Boling Arena (7,768); Knoxville, TN
November 17, 2022*; 7:00 pm, BTN+	No. 12	Bowling Green	W 96–61	4–0	Simon Skjodt Assembly Hall (3,673); Bloomington, IN
November 20, 2022*; 1:00 pm, BTN+	No. 12	Quinnipiac	W 92–55	5–0	Simon Skjodt Assembly Hall (3,912); Bloomington, IN
November 25, 2022*; 8:45 pm	No. 6	vs. Auburn; Las Vegas Invitational	W 96–85	6–0	The Mirage; Paradise, NV
November 26, 2022*; 8:45 pm, ESPN2	No. 6	vs. Memphis; Las Vegas Invitational	W 79–64	7–0	The Mirage; Paradise, NV
December 1, 2022*; 6:00 pm, BTN	No. 5	No. 6 North Carolina; ACC–Big Ten Challenge	W 87–63	8–0	Simon Skjodt Assembly Hall (5,939); Bloomington, IN
December 4, 2022; 2:00 pm, BTN+	No. 5	Illinois	W 65–61	9–0 (1–0)	Simon Skjodt Assembly Hall (5,381); Bloomington, IN
December 8, 2022; 7:00 pm, BTN	No. 4	at Penn State	W 67–58	10–0 (2–0)	Bryce Jordan Center (1,621); University Park, PA
December 18, 2022*; 2:00 pm, BTN+	No. 4	Morehead State	W 87–24	11–0	Simon Skjodt Assembly Hall (4,720); Bloomington, IN
December 21, 2022*; 1:00 pm, BTN+	No. 4	Butler	W 67–50	12–0	Simon Skjodt Assembly Hall (5,898); Bloomington, IN
December 29, 2022; 3:00 pm, BTN+	No. 4	at Michigan State	L 78–83	12–1 (2–1)	Breslin Center (4,533); East Lansing, MI
January 1, 2023; 1:00 pm, ESPN2	No. 4	Nebraska	W 74–62 ^{OT}	13–1 (3–1)	Simon Skjodt Assembly Hall (7,152); Bloomington, IN
January 8, 2023; 3:00 pm, ESPN2	No. 6	at Northwestern	W 72–50	14–1 (4–1)	Welsh–Ryan Arena (1,923); Evanston, IL
January 12, 2023; 6:30 pm, BTN	No. 6	No. 9 Maryland	W 68–61	15–1 (5–1)	Simon Skjodt Assembly Hall (5,789); Bloomington, IN
January 15, 2023; 2:00 pm, BTN+	No. 6	Wisconsin	W 93–56	16–1 (6–1)	Simon Skjodt Assembly Hall (10,422); Bloomington, IN
January 18, 2023; 8:00 pm, BTN+	No. 6	at No. 21 Illinois	W 83–72	17–1 (7–1)	State Farm Center (5,583); Champaign, IL
January 23, 2023; 8:00 pm, BTN	No. 6	at No. 13 Michigan	W 92–83	18–1 (8–1)	Crisler Center (2,987); Ann Arbor, MI
January 26, 2023; 8:30 pm, BTN	No. 6	No. 2 Ohio State	W 78–65	19–1 (9–1)	Simon Skjodt Assembly Hall (10,455); Bloomington, IN
January 29, 2023; 2:00 pm, BTN+	No. 6	Rutgers	W 91–68	20–1 (10–1)	Simon Skjodt Assembly Hall (8,598); Bloomington, IN
February 1, 2023; 8:00 pm, BTN+	No. 4	at Minnesota	W 77–54	21–1 (11–1)	Williams Arena (4,129); Minneapolis, MN
February 5, 2023; 2:00 pm, FS1	No. 4	at Purdue; Rivalry	W 69–46	22–1 (12–1)	Mackey Arena (14,876); West Lafayette, IN
February 9, 2023; 6:30 pm, BTN	No. 2	No. 5 Iowa	W 87–78	23–1 (13–1)	Simon Skjodt Assembly Hall (13,046); Bloomington, IN
February 13, 2023; 7:00 pm, BTN	No. 2	at No. 13 Ohio State	W 83–59	24–1 (14–1)	Value City Arena (7,178); Columbus, OH
February 16, 2023; 8:30 pm, BTN	No. 2	No. 12 Michigan	W 68–52	25–1 (15–1)	Simon Skjodt Assembly Hall (7,446); Bloomington, IN
February 19, 2023; 12:00 pm, BTN	No. 2	Purdue; Rivalry	W 83–60	26–1 (16–1)	Simon Skjodt Assembly Hall (17,222); Bloomington, IN
February 26, 2023; 2:00 pm, ESPN	No. 2	at No. 6 Iowa; College GameDay	L 85–86	26–2 (16–2)	Carver–Hawkeye Arena (15,056); Iowa City, IA
Big Ten tournament
March 3, 2023; 12:30 pm, BTN	(1) No. 2	vs. (9) Michigan State; Quarterfinals	W 94–85	27–2	Target Center (5,544); Minneapolis, MN
March 4, 2023; 2:30 pm, BTN	(1) No. 2	vs. (4) No. 14 Ohio State; Semifinals	L 75–79	27–3	Target Center; Minneapolis, MN
NCAA tournament
March 18, 2023*; 11:30 am, ESPN2	(1 G2) No. 2	(16 G2) Tennessee Tech; First round	W 77–47	28–3	Simon Skjodt Assembly Hall; Bloomington, IN
March 20, 2023*; 8:00 pm, ESPN2	(1 G2) No. 2	(9 G2) Miami (FL); Second round	L 68–70	28–4	Simon Skjodt Assembly Hall (14,480); Bloomington, IN
*Non-conference game. ^{#}Rankings from AP Poll. (#) Tournament seedings in parentheses. G2=Greenville 2. All times are in Eastern Time. Source:

== Rankings ==
Ranking movements Legend: ██ Increase in ranking ██ Decrease in ranking ( ) = First-place votes
	Week																			
Poll	Pre	1	2	3	4	5	6	7	8	9	10	11	12	13	14	15	16	17	18	Final
AP	11	12	6	5	4	4	4	4	6	6	6	6	4	2	2	2 (1)	2	3	2	Not released
Coaches	11	9	5	4	3	3	3	3	7	6	6	6	5	3	2	2 (1)	2	2	2	7
