= 2024 NCAA Division I women's basketball championship game =

American collegiate basketball final

National championship game
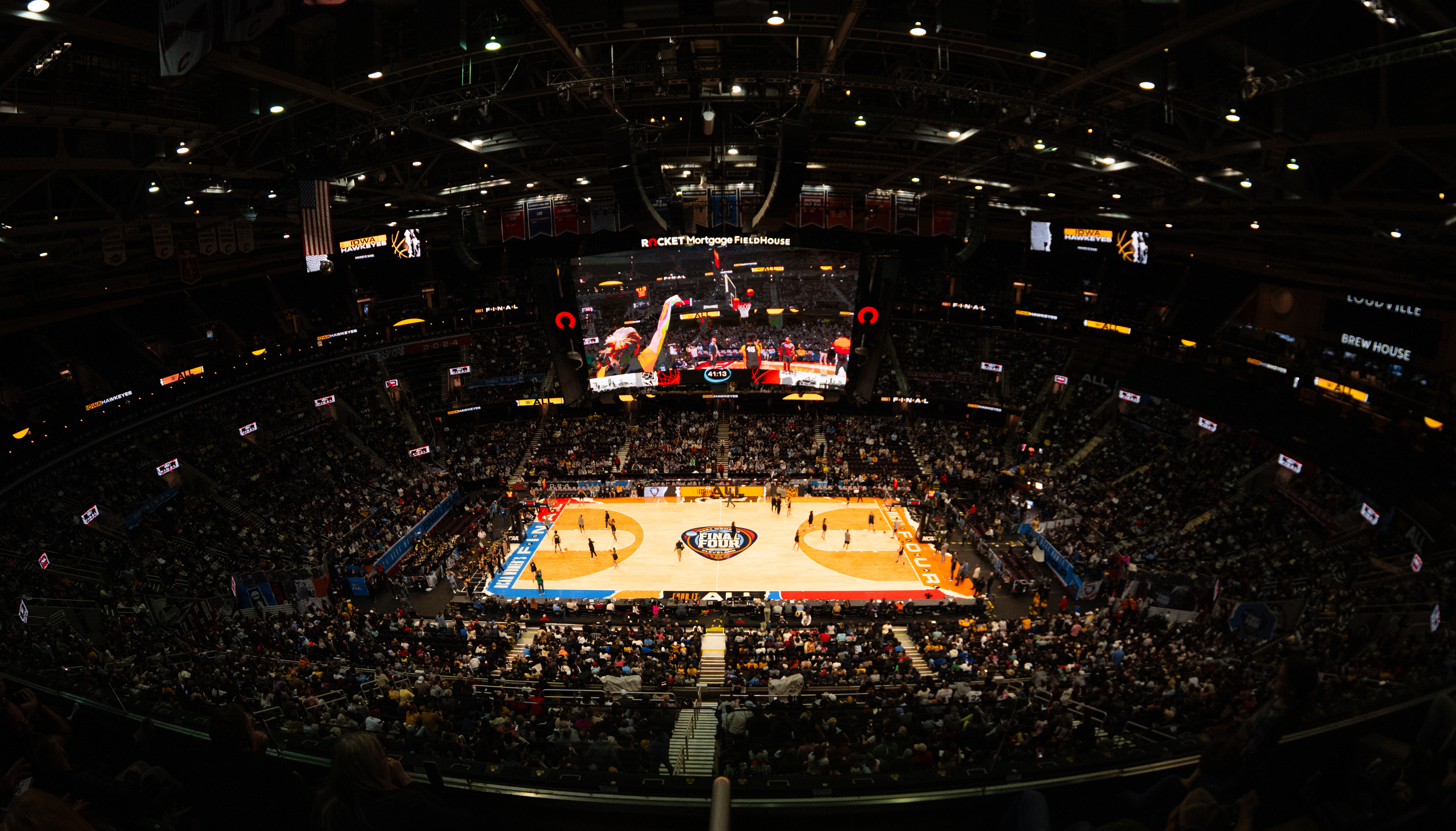
- Rocket Mortgage FieldHouse before the championship game between the Iowa Hawkeyes and the South Carolina Gamecocks.
Iowa Hawkeyes	South Carolina Gamecocks
Big Ten	SEC
(34–4)	(37–0)
75	87
Head coach: Lisa Bluder	Head coach: Dawn Staley
- AP: 2
- Coaches: 2
- AP: 1
- Coaches: 1
	1	2	3	4	Total
Iowa Hawkeyes	27	19	13	16	75
South Carolina Gamecocks	20	29	19	19	87
- Date: April 7, 2024
- Venue: Rocket Mortgage FieldHouse, Cleveland, Ohio
- MVP: Kamilla Cardoso, South Carolina
- Favorite: South Carolina by 6.5
- Referees: Brenda Pantoja, Joseph Vasily, Angelica Suffren
- Attendance: 18,300
- National anthem: Michelle Brooks-Thompson

United States TV coverage
- Network: ABC
- Announcers: Ryan Ruocco (play-by-play); Rebecca Lobo (analyst); Holly Rowe (sideline)
- Nielsen Ratings: 9.3 (18.7 million)

The 2024 NCAA Division I women's basketball championship game was the final game of the 2024 NCAA Division I women's basketball tournament. It determined the champion of the 2023–24 NCAA Division I women's basketball season and was contested by the Iowa Hawkeyes from the Big Ten Conference and the South Carolina Gamecocks from the Southeastern Conference. The game was played on April 7, 2024, at Rocket Mortgage FieldHouse in Cleveland, Ohio. South Carolina defeated Iowa 87–75 to capture their third national championship in program history. Iowa finished as runner-up for the second season in a row.

Iowa scored the game's first ten points and led by seven points at the end of the first quarter behind an NCAA championship-record eighteen points from Caitlin Clark. South Carolina started the second quarter scoring seven consecutive points to tie the game, 27–27, and South Carolina's Kamilla Cardoso gave her team the lead with five minutes left in the half. Shots made by both teams kept the game close and the Gamecocks took a three-point lead into halftime after baskets by Te-Hina Paopao and Raven Johnson. The South Carolina lead was stretched to nine points shortly into the third quarter and a Johnson three-point field goal pushed it to eleven points before a layup by Sydney Affolter brought the Hawkeyes' deficit back to nine. The start of the fourth quarter saw South Carolina take a thirteen-point lead, shortly followed by three-pointers by Clark and Gabbie Marshall. The end of the fourth quarter saw a 7–0 run by South Carolina that finalized their championship victory, 87–75. South Carolina's Cardoso was named Most Outstanding Player (MOP) following her 15-point, 17-rebound performance.

== Participants ==
=== Iowa Hawkeyes ===
The Hawkeyes, representing the University of Iowa in Iowa City, Iowa, were led by head coach Lisa Bluder in her 24th season at the school. Ranked No. 3 in the Associated Press (AP) preseason poll, they won their first three games of the season, including a neutral site win over No. 8 Virginia Tech in Charlotte, North Carolina, before suffering a loss to Kansas State. They participated in the Gulf Coast Showcase, where they defeated Purdue Fort Wayne, Florida Gulf Coast, and avenged their loss to Kansas State. In Big Ten Conference play, the Hawkeyes defeated Michigan State 76–73 on a three-point buzzer beater by Caitlin Clark and scored home victories over No. 14 Indiana and No. 2 Ohio State. They finished 15–3 in the conference, with those losses coming on the road to Ohio State and Indiana, along with Nebraska, which rallied from 14 points down in the 4th quarter to send Iowa home with a defeat. Caitlin Clark earned consensus national player of the year honors. The Hawkeyes received the No. 2 seed in the Big Ten tournament, where they defeated Penn State, Michigan and Nebraska en route to their third consecutive conference tournament championship.

Iowa received the Big Ten's automatic invitation to the NCAA tournament by virtue of their conference tournament championship and were selected as the No. 1 seed in the Albany Regional 2. The Hawkeyes hosted first- and second-round games at their home arena, Carver–Hawkeye Arena in Iowa City, and they defeated No. 16 seed Holy Cross in their first-round game. The other first-round game played in Iowa City saw No. 8 seed West Virginia defeat No. 9 seed Princeton, and Iowa defeated West Virginia by ten points in the second round to advance to the regional semifinal. There, they faced and defeated No. 5 seed Colorado at MVP Arena in Albany, and they took down No. 3 seed LSU 94–87 in a rematch of the previous year's national championship game. That game drew 12.3 million viewers, at the time the most ever for a women's college basketball game. They won 71–69 over UConn in the national semifinal – establishing a new viewership mark at 14.2 million viewers – to reach the national championship game for the second year in a row.

=== South Carolina Gamecocks ===
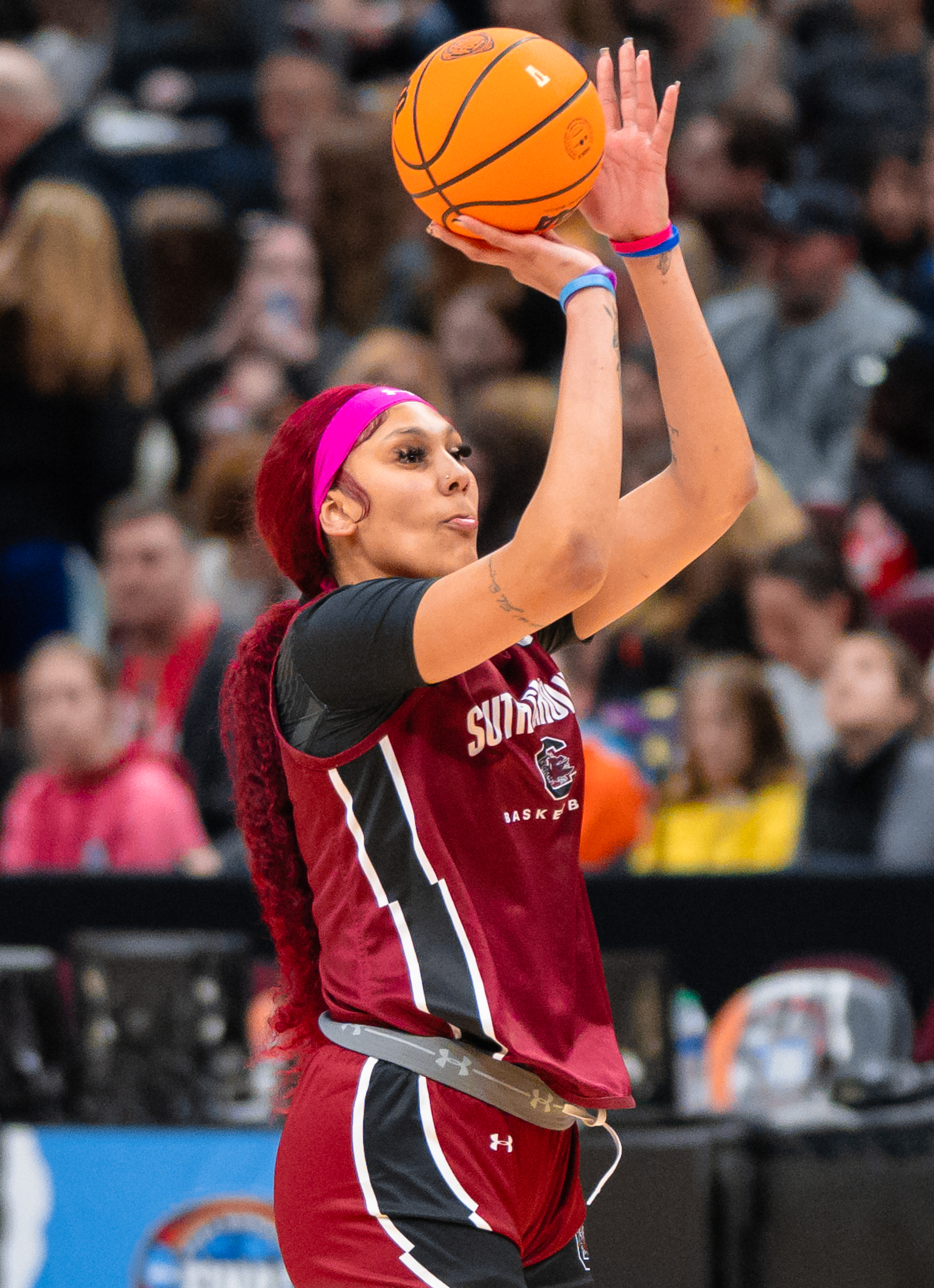
Kamilla Cardoso (pictured pregame) was named Most Outstanding Player.

The Gamecocks, representing the University of South Carolina in Columbia, South Carolina, were led by head coach Dawn Staley in her 16th season at the school. They began the season No. 6 in the AP Poll's preseason rankings and elevated to No. 1, securing twenty-three of thirty-six first place votes, by November 13 after two early wins over No. 10 Notre Dame and No. 14 Maryland. South Carolina earned further non-conference wins over AP-ranked teams against No. 24 North Carolina and No. 11 Utah, and the Gamecocks entered conference play with a 12–0 record. The team completed a perfect 16–0 season in conference play, with only two games decided by a single-digit margin (9-point win at No. 9 LSU and an 8-point win at home over Tennessee). South Carolina also won a non-conference game over No. 11 UConn on February 11 and finished the regular season with a 29–0 record.

South Carolina received the automatic invitation from the Southeastern Conference (SEC) to the NCAA tournament by defeating Texas A&M, Tennessee, and No 8 LSU to secure the conference tournament championship and were selected as the No. 1 seed in the Albany Regional 1. Like Iowa, the Gamecocks hosted first- and second-round games at their home arena, Colonial Life Arena in Columbia, and they defeated No. 16 seed Presbyterian in their first-round game. The other first-round game played in Columbia saw No. 8 seed North Carolina defeat No. 9 seed Michigan State, and South Carolina defeated North Carolina by 47 points in the second round to advance to the regional semifinal. There, they faced and defeated No. 4 seed Indiana at MVP Arena in Albany, and beat No. 3 seed Oregon State 70–58 to reach the Final Four for the fourth consecutive season. They won 78–59 over NC State in the national semifinal to reach the national championship game for the second time in three seasons, and they entered the championship game looking to finish as the 10th unbeaten national champion in women's NCAA basketball history. Entering this game, South Carolina had won 79 of 80 games, with the only loss coming to Iowa in the 2023 national semifinal round.

== Starting lineups ==
Iowa	Position		South Carolina
Hannah Stuelke	F		Chloe Kitts
Caitlin Clark	G	C	Kamilla Cardoso
Sydney Affolter	G		Raven Johnson
Kate Martin	G		Bree Hall
Gabbie Marshall	G		Te-Hina Paopao
Source: ESPN

== Game summary ==
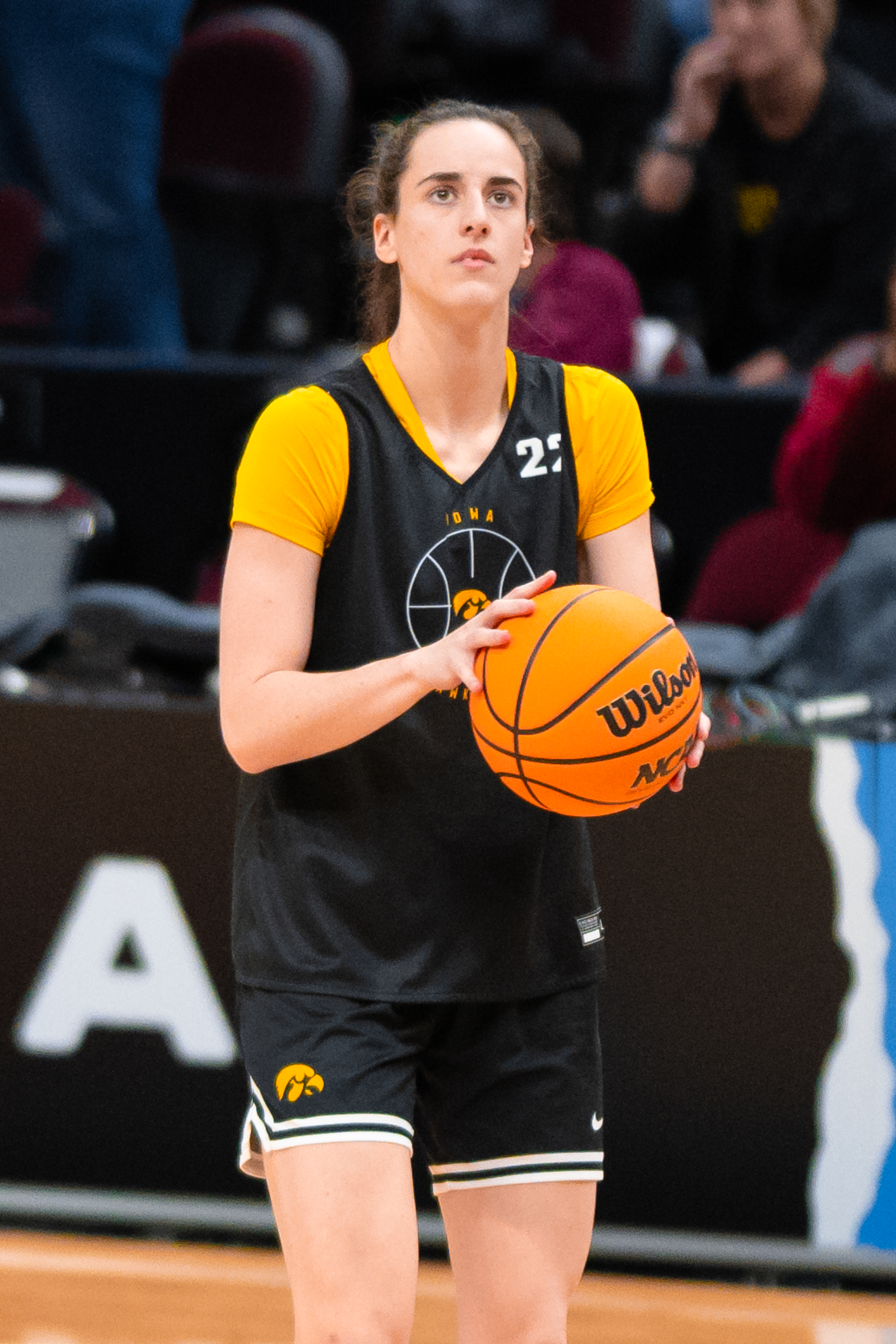
Caitlin Clark (pictured pregame) led all scorers with 30 points.

The game began with South Carolina winning the opening tip, and Iowa opened the game's scoring with a three-point jump shot made by Iowa's Kate Martin twenty-two seconds in. Another made shot by Martin was followed by jumpers by Sydney Affolter and Caitlin Clark, giving Iowa a 10–0 lead to begin the game. South Carolina's first made shot came nearly three minutes into the game on a Kamilla Cardoso layup. Clark attempted six free throws over the next minute and a half of game time, making five, along with a layup and a three-point shot; South Carolina scored on shots by Te-Hina Paopao, Cardoso, and Chloe Kitts. With Iowa leading 20–9, neither team scored for nearly a minute before Sania Feagin broke the drought with a layup, followed by a layup by MiLaysia Fulwiley. After two free throws by Martin, South Carolina scored on shots by Fulwiley and Tessa Johnson and narrowed Iowa' lead to two points. Clark ended the quarter with two consecutive jump shots, giving Iowa a 27–20 lead. Clark's eighteen points in the first quarter were an NCAA championship record. The second quarter began with South Carolina scoring seven unanswered points via Johnson and Cardoso, tying the game at 27 points apiece. Affolter scored Iowa's first points of the quarter on a three-point jumper two minutes in. The teams then traded baskets and South Carolina took a two-point lead with Cardoso's made layup with 4:58 remaining in the half. Stuelke reestablished Iowa's lead but Kitts tied the game again with a free throw, though shots made shortly after by Stuelke and Martin put Iowa back ahead by four points. The teams traded the lead for the remainder of the quarter and the Gamecocks finished the half with made shots by Paopao and Raven Johnson and took a three-point lead into halftime.

The Gamecocks began the second half with possession of the ball and extended their lead to nine points in short order with made shots by Kitts and Paopao; a Clark jump shot with 7:15 left marked Iowa's first points of the half and narrowed South Carolina's lead to 55–48. The teams traded field goals for the next few minutes, with South Carolina maintaining the lead. Consecutive three-point shots by Johnson and Bree Hall extended the Gamecocks' advantage to ten points; after Martin made two free throws for Iowa, Johnson made another three-pointer to put her team ahead by eleven. After an Iowa timeout, Affolter made a layup with fifty-one seconds remaining in the third quarter to narrow the deficit to nine points; the quarter ended with no further scoring and South Carolina took a 68–59 lead into the final quarter. South Carolina's lead expanded to thirteen points with eight minutes remaining in the game. A Clark three-pointer a minute later made the score 76–67, and Marshall made a three-pointer of her own shortly afterwards to narrow the deficit to six points. Made shots by Martin and Affolter kept the Gamecocks' lead to five after a Hall jump shot, though South Carolina scored the next seven points on shots by Paopao, Cardoso, Watkins, and Johnson. Leading 87–75, South Carolina was able to run the remaining time off of the clock and secure a national championship victory.

ABC

April 7, 2024
3:00 p.m. EDT

No. 1 Iowa Hawkeyes 75, No. 1 South Carolina Gamecocks 87
Scoring by quarter: 27–20, 19–29, 13–19, 16–19
Pts: Clark – 30; Rebs: Clark – 8 Asts: Clark – 5	Pts: Johnson – 19; Rebs: Cardoso – 17; Asts: Fulwiley – 4

Rocket Mortgage FieldHouse, Cleveland, Ohio

Starters:			Pts	Reb	Ast
F	45	Hannah Stuelke	11	3	2
G	22	Caitlin Clark	30	8	5
G	3	Sydney Affolter	12	3	3
G	20	Kate Martin	16	5	0
G	24	Gabbie Marshall	6	3	1
Reserves:					
F	44	Addison O'Grady	0	2	2
G	4	Kylie Feuerbach	0	1	0
Head coach:
Lisa Bluder

Iowa	South Carolina

Iowa	Statistics	South Carolina
25/63 (39.7%)	Field goals	35/73 (47.9%)
9/23 (39.1%)	3-pt field goals	8/19 (42.1%)
16/20 (80.0%)	Free throws	9/17 (52.9%)
7	Offensive rebounds	18
22	Defensive rebounds	33
29	Total rebounds	51
13	Assists	16
9	Turnovers	13
6	Steals	8
4	Blocks	8
14	Fouls	17

Starters:			Pts	Reb	Ast
F	21	Chloe Kitts	11	10	2
C	10	Kamilla Cardoso	15	17	2
G	25	Raven Johnson	3	5	3
G	23	Bree Hall	7	0	0
G	0	Te-Hina Paopao	14	0	2
Reserves:					
F	2	Ashlyn Watkins	3	5	1
F	20	Sania Feagin	6	4	1
G	12	MiLaysia Fulwiley	9	4	4
G	5	Tessa Johnson	19	4	1
Head coach:
Dawn Staley

== Media coverage ==
For the second consecutive season, the championship game was televised in the United States by ABC. Ryan Ruocco was the play-by-play commentator, Rebecca Lobo was the analyst, and Holly Rowe was the sideline reporter. ESPN presented Megacast coverage of the game, an alternate broadcast hosted by The Bird & Taurasi Show with Sue Bird and Diana Taurasi on ESPN and ESPN+, and rail cam and data-enhanced ("Beyond the Rim") broadcasts on ESPN+.

Nielsen ratings reported that the final was seen by 18.7 million viewers—the largest-ever audience for a women's basketball game in the United States, and an 89 percent year-over-increase over 2023. It was the third consecutive tournament game to break the record in a single week, following the Elite Eight match between Iowa and LSU on April 1 (which had drawn 12.3 million viewers) and the Final Four match between Iowa and UConn on April 5 (which had drawn 14.2 million viewers). The game was the most-watched basketball game of any kind broadcast by an ESPN network since 2019. It was the second most-watched non-Olympic women's sporting event ever broadcast on live U.S. television, behind only the 2015 Women's World Cup final.

== Aftermath ==
South Carolina's national championship victory marked the first undefeated national championship season in Division I women's basketball since UConn in 2016. Kamilla Cardoso was named Most Outstanding Player (MOP). The championship was the third for South Carolina head coach Dawn Staley, making her just the fifth coach to win three NCAA Division I women's basketball championships. It was the third title in South Carolina program history; the team had never advanced past the national semifinal round prior to Staley's arrival. Several days before the game, Staley was named Naismith College Coach of the Year for the third consecutive year and the fourth year overall.

The 2024 WNBA draft was held on April 17 and saw players from both teams selected: Clark was picked first overall by the Indiana Fever, Cardoso was chosen third by the Chicago Sky, and Iowa's Kate Martin was drafted to the Las Vegas Aces with the eighteenth pick.

South Carolina returned to the championship game in 2025, where they lost to UConn, 59–82.

== See also ==
- 2024 NCAA Division I men's basketball championship game
