= 2024 Big Ten women's basketball tournament =

American college basketball postseason tournament

- Classification: Division I
- Season: 2023–24
- Teams: 14
- Site: Target Center; Minneapolis, MN
- Champions: Iowa (6th title)
- Winning coach: Lisa Bluder (5th title)
- MVP: Caitlin Clark (Iowa)
- Attendance: 129,512
- Television: Peacock, BTN, CBS

2023–24 Big Ten women's basketball standings
	Conf.				Overall
Team	W		L	PCT	W		L	PCT
No. 16 Ohio State	16	–	2	.889	26	–	6	.813
No. 2 Iowa †	15	–	3	.833	34	–	5	.872
No. 12 Indiana	15	–	3	.833	26	–	6	.813
Michigan State	12	–	6	.667	22	–	9	.710
Nebraska	11	–	7	.611	23	–	12	.657
Michigan	9	–	9	.500	20	–	14	.588
Penn State	9	–	9	.500	22	–	13	.629
Maryland	9	–	9	.500	19	–	14	.576
Illinois	8	–	10	.444	19	–	15	.559
Wisconsin	6	–	12	.333	15	–	17	.469
Minnesota	5	–	13	.278	20	–	16	.556
Purdue	5	–	13	.278	15	–	19	.441
Northwestern	4	–	14	.222	9	–	21	.300
Rutgers	2	–	16	.111	8	–	24	.250
† 2024 Big Ten tournament winner Rankings from AP Poll

The 2024 Big Ten women's basketball tournament (branded as the 2024 TIAA Big Ten Women's Basketball Tournament for sponsorship reasons) was a postseason women's basketball tournament for the Big Ten Conference of the 2023–24 NCAA Division I women's basketball season which took place from March 6–10, 2024. The tournament was held at the Target Center in Minneapolis, Minnesota. As the tournament winner, Iowa received the conference's automatic bid to the 2024 NCAA Division I women's basketball tournament. This was the first year in which the first round was broadcast by Peacock. This was the last year of the then-current tournament format, as the conference will expand to 18 teams the following year.

== Seeds ==
All 14 Big Ten schools participated in the tournament. Teams were seeded by conference record, with a tiebreaker system used to seed teams with identical conference records. The top 10 teams received a first round bye and the top four teams received a double bye.

Seed	School	Conference	Tiebreak 1	Tiebreak 2
1	Ohio State	16–2		
2	Iowa	15–3	1–1 vs. Indiana	1–1 vs. Ohio State
3	Indiana	15–3	1–1 vs. Iowa	0–1 vs. Ohio State
4	Michigan State	12–6		
5	Nebraska	11–7		
6	Michigan	9–9	2–0 vs. Penn State and Maryland	
7	Penn State	9–9	1–2 vs. Michigan and Maryland	1–0 vs. Nebraska (5 seed)
8	Maryland	9–9	1–2 vs. Penn State and Michigan	0–1 vs. Nebraska (5 seed)
9	Illinois	8–10		
10	Wisconsin	6–12		
11	Minnesota	5–13	1–0 vs. Purdue	
12	Purdue	5–13	0–1 vs. Minnesota	
13	Northwestern	4–14		
14	Rutgers	2–16		

Tiebreakers:

== Schedule ==
Session	Game	Time*	Matchup^{#}	Score	Television	Attendance
First round – Wednesday, March 6
1	1	5:30 p.m.	No. 12 Purdue vs. No. 13 Northwestern	78–72	Peacock	18,392
1	2	8:00 p.m.	No. 11 Minnesota vs. No. 14 Rutgers	77–69	Peacock	18,392
Second round – Thursday, March 7
2	3	11:30 a.m.	No. 8 Maryland vs. No. 9 Illinois	75−65	BTN	18,392
2	4	2:00 p.m.	No. 5 Nebraska vs. No. 12 Purdue	64−56	BTN	18,392
3	5	5:30 p.m.	No. 7 Penn State vs. No. 10 Wisconsin	80−56	BTN	18,392
3	6	8:00 p.m.	No. 6 Michigan vs. No. 11 Minnesota	76−57	BTN	18,392
Quarterfinals – Friday, March 8
4	7	11:30 a.m.	No. 1 Ohio State vs. No. 8 Maryland	61−82	BTN	18,481
4	8	2:00 p.m.	No. 4 Michigan State vs. No. 5 Nebraska	61−73	BTN	18,481
5	9	5:30 p.m.	No. 2 Iowa vs. No. 7 Penn State	95−62	BTN	18,575
5	10	8:00 p.m.	No. 3 Indiana vs. No. 6 Michigan	56−69	BTN	18,575
Semifinals – Saturday, March 9
6	11	1:00 p.m.	No. 8 Maryland vs. No. 5 Nebraska	68−78	BTN	18,746
6	12	3:30 p.m.	No. 2 Iowa vs. No. 6 Michigan	95−68	BTN	18,746
Championship – Sunday, March 10
7	13	11:00 a.m.	No. 5 Nebraska vs. No. 2 Iowa	89–94^{OT}	CBS	18,534
*Game times in Central Time. #Rankings denote tournament seeding.

== Bracket ==
First round Wednesday, March 6 Peacock
12	Purdue	78
13	Northwestern	72
11	Minnesota	77
14	Rutgers	69

Second round Thursday, March 7 BTN
8	Maryland	75
9	Illinois	65
5	Nebraska	64
12	Purdue	56
7	Penn State	80
10	Wisconsin	56
6	Michigan	76
11	Minnesota	57

Quarterfinals; Friday, March 8 BTN
1	Ohio State	61
8	Maryland	82
4	Michigan State	61
5	Nebraska	73
2	Iowa	95
7	Penn State	62
3	Indiana	56
6	Michigan	69

Semifinals; Saturday, March 9 BTN
8	Maryland	68
5	Nebraska	78
2	Iowa	95
6	Michigan	68

Championship; Sunday, March 10; CBS
5	Nebraska	89
2	Iowa	94*

* denotes overtime period

== Game summaries ==
=== First round ===
Peacock

March 6

No. 13 Northwestern 72, No. 12 Purdue 78
Scoring by half: 39–35, 33–43
Pts: Caileigh Walsh, 26; Rebs: Tied, 8 Asts: Caroline Lau, 5	Pts: Abbey Ellis, 25; Rebs: Jeanae Terry, 16; Asts: Jeanae Terry, 6

Target Center
Minneapolis, MN
Attendance: 18,392

Peacock

March 6

No. 14 Rutgers 69, No. 11 Minnesota 77
Scoring by half: 35–39, 34–38
Pts: Destiny Adams, 31; Rebs: Destiny Adams, 24; Asts: Antonia Bates, 4	Pts: Amaya Battle, 32; Rebs: Niamya Holloway, 9 Asts: Amaya Battle, 7

Target Center
Minneapolis, MN
Attendance: 18,392

=== Second round ===
BTN

March 7

No. 9 Illinois 65, No. 8 Maryland 75
Scoring by half: 37–35, 28–40
Pts: Makira Cook, 17; Rebs: Kendall Bostic, 11; Asts: Makira Cook, 8	Pts: Bri McDaniel, 20; Rebs: Bri McDaniel, 10; Asts: Shyanne Sellers, 8

Target Center
Minneapolis, MN
Attendance: 18,392

BTN

March 7

No. 12 Purdue 56, No. 5 Nebraska 64
Scoring by half: 25–25, 31–39
Pts: Sophie Swanson, 25; Rebs: Jeanae Terry, 11; Asts: Tied, 4	Pts: Jaz Shelley, 19; Rebs: Tied, 7 Asts: Jaz Shelley, 7

Target Center
Minneapolis, MN
Attendance: 18,392

BTN

March 7

No. 10 Wisconsin 56, No. 7 Penn State 80
Scoring by half: 29–45, 27–35
Pts: Ronnie Porter, 15; Rebs: Serah Williams, 10; Asts: Tied, 3	Pts: Kylie Lavelle, 14; Rebs: Ashley Owusu, 6 Asts: Makenna Marisa, 5

Target Center
Minneapolis, MN
Attendance: 18,392

BTN

March 7

No. 11 Minnesota 57, No. 6 Michigan 76
Scoring by half: 24–37, 33–39
Pts: Amaya Battle, 22; Rebs: Mallory Heyer, 17; Asts: Tied, 3	Pts: Laila Phelia, 23; Rebs: Elissa Brett, 6 Asts: Jordan Hobbs, 7

Target Center
Minneapolis, MN
Attendance: 18,392

=== Quarterfinals ===
BTN

March 8

No. 8 Maryland 82, No. 1 Ohio State 61
Scoring by half: 38–30, 44–31
Pts: Shyanne Sellers, 25; Rebs: Faith Masonius, 11; Asts: Shyanne Sellers, 7	Pts: Rebeka Mikulasikova, 16; Rebs: Cotie McMahon, 9 Asts: Celeste Taylor, 6

Target Center
Minneapolis, MN
Attendance: 18,481

BTN

March 8

No. 5 Nebraska 73, No. 4 Michigan State 61
Scoring by half: 36–29, 37–32
Pts: Alexis Markowski, 22; Rebs: Alexis Markowski, 12; Asts: Jaz Shelley, 5	Pts: Julia Ayrault, 25; Rebs: Julia Ayrault, 5 Asts: DeeDee Hagemann, 6

Target Center
Minneapolis, MN
Attendance: 18,481

BTN

March 8

No. 7 Penn State 62, No. 2 Iowa 95
Scoring by half: 26–46, 36–49
Pts: Leilani Kapinus, 19; Rebs: Ashley Owusu, 6 Asts: Tied, 3	Pts: Caitlin Clark, 24; Rebs: Caitlin Clark, 10; Asts: Caitlin Clark, 7

Target Center
Minneapolis, MN
Attendance: 18,481

BTN

March 8

No. 6 Michigan 69, No. 3 Indiana 56
Scoring by half: 21–35, 48–21
Pts: Laila Phelia, 30; Rebs: Chyra Evans, 7 Asts: Jordan Hobbs, 5	Pts: Sara Scalia, 14; Rebs: Sydney Parrish, 9 Asts: Chloe Moore-McNeil, 5

Target Center
Minneapolis, MN
Attendance: 18,575

=== Semifinals ===
BTN

March 9

No. 8 Maryland 68, No. 5 Nebraska 78
Scoring by half: 40–47, 28–31
Pts: Shyanne Sellers, 15; Rebs: Faith Masonius, 9 Asts: Shyanne Sellers, 7	Pts: Jaz Shelley, 30; Rebs: Alexis Markowski, 13; Asts: Jaz Shelley, 9

Target Center
Minneapolis, MN
Attendance: 18,746

BTN

March 9

No. 2 Iowa 95, No. 6 Michigan 68
Scoring by half: 51–42, 44–26
Pts: Caitlin Clark, 28; Rebs: Sydney Affolter, 7 Asts: Caitlin Clark, 15	Pts: Laila Phelia, 21; Rebs: Elise Stuck, 5 Asts: Laila Phelia, 7

Target Center
Minneapolis, MN
Attendance: 18,746

=== Championship ===
CBS

March 10
12:00

No. 5 Nebraska 89, No. 2 Iowa 94 (OT)
Scoring by half: 46–35, 31–42 Overtime: 12–17
Pts: Alexis Markowski, 23; Rebs: Alexis Markowski, 13; Asts: Jaz Shelley, 13	Pts: Caitlin Clark, 34; Rebs: Sydney Affolter, 11; Asts: Caitln Clark, 12

Target Center
Minneapolis, MN
Attendance: 18,534
Referees: Felicia Gritner, Gina Cross, Michael McConnell

== All-Tournament team ==
- Caitlin Clark, Iowa – Most Outstanding Player
- Sydney Affolter, Iowa
- Laila Phelia, Michigan
- Jaz Shelley, Nebraska
- Alexis Markowski, Nebraska
