= 2023–24 Minnesota Golden Gophers women's basketball team =

Intercollegiate basketball season

2023–24 Minnesota Golden Gophers women's basketball

WNIT, Runners-up
- Conference: Big Ten Conference
- Record: 20–16 (5–13 Big Ten)
- Head coach: Dawn Plitzuweit (1st season)
- Associate head coach: Jason Jeschke
- Assistant coaches: Aaron Horn; Aerial Braker; Rachel Banham; Tyler VanWinkle
- Home arena: Williams Arena

2023–24 Big Ten women's basketball standings
| | Conf. | | | | Overall |
| Team | W | | L | PCT | W | | L | PCT |
|---|---|---|---|---|---|---|---|---|
| No. 16 Ohio State | 16 | – | 2 | .889 | 26 | – | 6 | .813 |
| No. 2 Iowa † | 15 | – | 3 | .833 | 34 | – | 5 | .872 |
| No. 12 Indiana | 15 | – | 3 | .833 | 26 | – | 6 | .813 |
| Michigan State | 12 | – | 6 | .667 | 22 | – | 9 | .710 |
| Nebraska | 11 | – | 7 | .611 | 23 | – | 12 | .657 |
| Michigan | 9 | – | 9 | .500 | 20 | – | 14 | .588 |
| Penn State | 9 | – | 9 | .500 | 22 | – | 13 | .629 |
| Maryland | 9 | – | 9 | .500 | 19 | – | 14 | .576 |
| Illinois | 8 | – | 10 | .444 | 19 | – | 15 | .559 |
| Wisconsin | 6 | – | 12 | .333 | 15 | – | 17 | .469 |
| Minnesota | 5 | – | 13 | .278 | 20 | – | 16 | .556 |
| Purdue | 5 | – | 13 | .278 | 15 | – | 19 | .441 |
| Northwestern | 4 | – | 14 | .222 | 9 | – | 21 | .300 |
| Rutgers | 2 | – | 16 | .111 | 8 | – | 24 | .250 |
† 2024 Big Ten tournament winner Rankings from AP Poll

The 2023–24 Minnesota Golden Gophers women's basketball team represented the University of Minnesota during the 2023–24 NCAA Division I women's basketball season. The Golden Gophers, led by first-year head coach Dawn Plitzuweit, played their home games at Williams Arena and compete as members of the Big Ten Conference. Plitzuweit was hired in March 2023 after she spent one year at West Virginia.

== Previous season ==
The Golden Gophers finished the 2022–2023 season with a 11–19 record and 4–14 in Big Ten play to finish in twelfth place. As the twelfth seed in the Big Ten tournament, they were defeated by Penn State in the First Round. They were not invited to the NCAA Tournament or chosen for the WNIT. Alanna Micheaux was named to the Big Ten Conference Honorable Mention Team, while Mara Braun was named to the All-Freshman Team by both the coaches and media.

Following their loss to Penn State in the Big Ten Tournament, the Gophers announced that head coach Lindsay Whalen had resigned and stepped down as head coach. Dawn Plitzuweit was hired 2 weeks later as the new head coach for the Gophers.

== Offseason ==
=== Departures ===
| Name | Number | Pos. | Height | Year | Hometown | Notes |
|---|---|---|---|---|---|---|
| Alanna Micheaux | 4 | F | 6'2" | Sophomore | Wayne, Michigan | Transferred to Virginia Tech |
| Alexa Ratzlaff | 12 | G | 5'9" | Freshman | Rosemount, Minnesota | |
| Destinee Oberg | 13 | C | 6'3" | Senior | Burnsville, Minnesota | Transferred to North Dakota |
| Isabelle Gradwell | 14 | G/F | 6'1" | Graduate Senior | Marshalltown, Iowa | Graduated |
| Angelina Hammond | 15 | G/F | 6'1" | Graduate Senior | Hopkins, Minnesota | Transferred to St. Thomas |
| Mi'Cole Cayton | 21 | G | 5'9" | Graduate Senior | Stockton, California | Transferred to Pepperdine |
| Katie Borowicz | 23 | G | 5'7" | Redshirt Freshman | Roseau, Minnesota | Medically Retired |
| Maria Counts | 31 | G/F | 5'11" | Freshman | Plymouth, Minnesota | Transferred to Minnesota-Duluth |

=== Arrivals ===
| Name | Number | Pos. | Height | Year | Hometown | Previous School | Notes |
|---|---|---|---|---|---|---|---|
| Janay Sanders | 30 | G | 5'11" | Graduate Senior | Charlotte, North Carolina | App State | |

=== 2023 Recruiting class ===
On November 16, 2023, the Gophers announced the signing of 4 players Kennedy Klick, MyKynnlie Dalan, Ajok Madol and Dominika Paurová to scholarships, while also Brynn Senden signed an Acceptance of Admission to be a walk-on for the 2023–24 season. Following the resignation of Lindsay Whalen after the 2022–23 season, Paurová asked and granted her release from the Gophers, and then committed to Oregon State.

After the hiring of Plitzuweit, she signed two players that she got to commit to West Virginia when she was there in - Grace Grocholski and Ayianna Johnson.

College recruiting
| Name | Hometown | School | Height | Weight | Commit date |
|---|---|---|---|---|---|
| Kennedy Klick; G | Brooklyn Park, MN | Maple Grove High School | 5 ft 11 in (1.80 m) | N/A | Nov 16, 2022 |
| Kennedy Klick; G | Recruit ratings: No ratings found | | | | |
| MyKynnlie Dalan; F | Montesano, WA | Montesano High School | 6 ft 1 in (1.85 m) | N/A | Nov 16, 2022 |
| MyKynnlie Dalan; F | Recruit ratings: No ratings found | | | | |
| Ajok Madol; G/F | Regina, Saskatchewan | Archbishop M.C. O'Neill High School | 6 ft 2 in (1.88 m) | N/A | Nov 16, 2022 |
| Ajok Madol; G/F | Recruit ratings: No ratings found | | | | |
| Brynn Senden; G | Wayzata, MN | Wayzata High School | 5 ft 6 in (1.68 m) | N/A | Nov 16, 2022 |
| Brynn Senden; G | Recruit ratings: No ratings found | | | | |
| Ayianna Johnson; F | Jefferson, WI | Jefferson High School | 6 ft 1 in (1.85 m) | N/A | May 4, 2023 |
| Ayianna Johnson; F | Recruit ratings: No ratings found | | | | |
| Grace Grocholski; G/F | North Prairie, WI | Kettle Moraine High School | 5 ft 10 in (1.78 m) | N/A | Apr 12, 2023 |
| Grace Grocholski; G/F | Recruit ratings: ESPN: (91) | | | | |
Overall recruit ranking:
Note: In many cases, Scout, Rivals, 247Sports, On3, and ESPN may conflict in their listings of height and weight.; In these cases, the average was taken. ESPN grades are on a 100-point scale.; Sources:

== Roster ==
2023–24 Minnesota Golden Gophers women's basketball team
Players
Coaches

| Pos. | # | Name | Height | Year | Previous school | Hometown |
|---|---|---|---|---|---|---|
| F | 1 | Ayianna Johnson | 6 ft 3 in (1.91 m) | Fr | Jefferson | Jefferson, WI |
| G | 3 | Amaya Battle | 5 ft 11 in (1.8 m) | So | Hopkins | Hopkins, MN |
| G | 5 | Maggie Czinano | 6 ft 0 in (1.83 m) | Jr | Watertown-Mayer | Watertown, MN |
| G | 10 | Mara Braun | 6 ft 0 in (1.83 m) | So | Wayzata | Wayzata, MN |
| F/C | 11 | Aminata Zie | 6 ft 1 in (1.85 m) | Sr | Western Nebraska CC; Stony Brook | Paris, France |
| G/F | 12 | Ajok Madol | 6 ft 2 in (1.88 m) | Fr | Archbishop M.C. O'Neill | Regina, Saskatchewan |
| G | 15 | Brynn Senden | 5 ft 6 in (1.68 m) | Fr | Wayzata | Wayzata, MN |
| G | 22 | Kennedy Klick | 5 ft 11 in (1.8 m) | Fr | Maple Grove | Brooklyn Park, MN |
| F | 24 | Mallory Heyer | 6 ft 1 in (1.85 m) | So | Chaska | Chaska, MN |
| G/F | 25 | Grace Grocholski | 5 ft 10 in (1.78 m) | Fr | Kettle Moraine | North Prairie, WI |
| G | 30 | Janay Sanders | 5 ft 11 in (1.8 m) | GS | App State | Charlotte, NC |
| F | 34 | McKynnlie Dalan | 6 ft 1 in (1.85 m) | Fr | Montesano | Montesano, WA |
| F | 41 | Niamya Holloway | 6 ft 0 in (1.83 m) | RS Fr | Eden Prairie | Eden Prairie, MN |
| C | 52 | Sophie Hart | 6 ft 5 in (1.96 m) | Jr | NC State | Farmington, MN |

Head coach

- Dawn Plitzuweit (Michigan Tech)

Assistant coach(es)

- Jason Jeschke (Southwestern (KS))
- Aaron Horn (Toledo)
- Ariel Braker (Notre Dame)
- Rachel Banham (Minnesota)
- Tyler VanWinkle (Illinois State)

Legend

- (C) Team captain
- (S) Suspended
- (I) Ineligible
- (W) Walk-on
- Injured
- Current redshirt

Roster
Last update: August 12, 2022

== Schedule and results ==
| Date time, TV | Rank^{#} | Opponent^{#} | Result | Record | High points | High rebounds | High assists | Site (attendance) city, state |
Regular season
| November 8, 2023*; 7:00 p.m., B1G+ | | Long Island | W 92–57 | 1–0 | 25 – Braun | 8 – Heyer | 6 – Braun | Williams Arena (3,141); Minneapolis, MN |
| November 12, 2023*; 1:00 p.m., B1G+ | | Chicago State | W 100–42 | 2–0 | 25 – Braun | 7 – Heyer | 7 – Battle | Williams Arena (2,856); Minneapolis, MN |
| November 15, 2023*; 7:00 p.m., B1G+ | | North Dakota State | W 75–53 | 3–0 | 20 – Battle | 12 – Heyer | 9 – Battle | Williams Arena (2,816); Minneapolis, MN |
| November 19, 2023*; 4:00 p.m., FS1 | | No. 8 UConn | L 44–62 | 3–1 | 12 – Braun | 8 – Braun | 5 – Braun | Williams Arena (10,869); Minneapolis, MN |
| November 22, 2023*; 7:00 p.m., B1G+ | | Cal State Northridge | W 84–31 | 4–1 | 21 – Braun | 6 – Tied | 7 – Grocholski | Williams Arena (2,728); Minneapolis, MN |
| November 26, 2023*; 2:00 p.m., B1G+ | | Stony Brook | W 67–54 | 5–1 | 17 – Tied | 12 – Battle | 9 – Battle | Williams Arena (3,122); Minneapolis, MN |
| November 29, 2023*; 7:00 p.m., B1G+ | | Norfolk State | W 74–43 | 6–1 | 26 – Grocholski | 12 – Heyer | 5 – Battle | Williams Arena (2,820); Minneapolis, MN |
| December 2, 2023*; 1:00 p.m., B1G+ | | Drake | W 94–88 ^{2OT} | 7–1 | 33 – Braun | 10 – Heyer | 5 – Grocholski | Williams Arena (4,578); Minneapolis, MN |
| December 6, 2023*; 6:00 p.m., SECN+/ESPN+ | | at Kentucky | W 76–57 | 8–1 | 25 – Braun | 10 – Hart | 6 – Battle | Rupp Arena (3,386); Lexington, KY |
| December 10, 2023; 1:00 p.m., B1G+ | | Purdue | W 60–58 | 9–1 (1–0) | 21 – Braun | 12 – Heyer | 4 – Battle | Williams Arena (3,834); Minneapolis, MN |
| December 13, 2023*; 11:00 a.m., B1G+ | | Grambling State | W 96–64 | 10–1 | 26 – Braun | 9 – Heyer | 10 – Battle | Williams Arena (5,291); Minneapolis, MN |
| December 21, 2023*; 3:00 p.m., B1G+ | | Lindenwood | W 100–45 | 11–1 | 21 – Braun | 10 – Czinano | 8 – Battle | Williams Arena (3,069); Minneapolis, MN |
| December 30, 2023; 1:00 p.m., BTN | | at No. 4 Iowa | L 71–94 | 11–2 (1–1) | 16 – Battle | 6 – Hart | 5 – Tied | Carver–Hawkeye Arena (14,998); Iowa City, IA |
| January 3, 2024; 7:00 p.m., B1G+ | | Maryland | L 64–72 | 11–3 (1–2) | 20 – Braun | 10 – Heyer | 5 – Battle | Williams Arena (2,362); Minneapolis, MN |
| January 9, 2024; 7:00 p.m., BTN | | at Michigan | W 82–66 | 12–3 (2–2) | 21 – Heyer | 9 – Battle | 4 – Tied | Crisler Center (2,112); Ann Arbor, MI |
| January 14, 2024; 2:00 p.m., B1G+ | | Nebraska | W 62–58 | 13–3 (3–2) | 16 – Heyer | 7 – Heyer | 5 – Battle | Williams Arena (5,958); Minneapolis, MN |
| January 17, 2024; 7:00 p.m., Peacock | | at No. 16 Indiana | L 62–85 | 13–4 (3–3) | 19 – Grocholski | 6 – Heyer | 3 – Battle | Simon Skjodt Assembly Hall (7,977); Bloomington, IN |
| January 20, 2024; 2:00 p.m., B1G+ | | Michigan State | W 69–50 | 14–4 (4–3) | 18 – Heyer | 15 – Heyer | 4 – Grocholski | Williams Arena (5,020); Minneapolis, MN |
| January 23, 2024; 8:00 p.m., BTN | | at Wisconsin | L 56–59 | 14–5 (4–4) | 13 – Grocholski | 7 – Tied | 4 – Battle | Kohl Center (4,191); Madison, WI |
| January 28, 2024; 2:00 p.m., B1G+ | | at Illinois | L 68–73 | 14–6 (4–5) | 18 – Tied | 8 – Battle | 7 – Battle | State Farm Center (4,788); Champaign, IL |
| January 31, 2024; 7:00 p.m., B1G+ | | Penn State | L 64–80 | 14–7 (4–6) | 13 – Tied | 9 – Heyer | 5 – Battle | Williams Arena (3,319); Minneapolis, MN |
| February 5, 2024; 5:00 p.m., BTN | | at Michigan State | L 65–76 | 14–8 (4–7) | 23 – Sanders | 11 – Heyer | 10 – Battle | Breslin Center (3,154); East Lansing, MI |
| February 8, 2024; 8:00 p.m., Peacock | | No. 5 Ohio State | L 47–71 | 14–9 (4–8) | 16 – Sanders | 7 – Tied | 6 – Battle | Williams Arena (3,572); Minneapolis, MN |
| February 13, 2024; 6:00 p.m., BTN | | at Rutgers | L 73–81 | 14–10 (4–9) | 23 – Grocholski | 8 – Heyer | 10 – Battle | Jersey Mike's Arena (1,511); Piscataway, NJ |
| February 17, 2024; 2:00 p.m., B1G+ | | Northwestern | W 88–63 | 15–10 (5–9) | 27 – Grocholski | 8 – Heyer | 6 – Sanders | Williams Arena (4,882); Minneapolis, MN |
| February 20, 2024; 6:00 p.m., BTN | | Wisconsin | L 56–67 | 15–11 (5–10) | 16 – Battle | 7 – Johnson | 5 – Battle | Williams Arena (4,559); Minneapolis, MN |
| February 24, 2024; 4:00 p.m., B1G+ | | at Nebraska | L 51–70 | 15–12 (5–11) | 15 – Heyer | 10 – Heyer | 4 – Battle | Pinnacle Bank Arena (7,101); Lincoln, NE |
| February 28, 2024; 8:00 p.m., Peacock | | No. 6 Iowa | L 60–108 | 15–13 (5–12) | 18 – Battle | 11 – Heyer | 4 – Battle | Williams Arena (14,625); Minneapolis, MN |
| March 3, 2024; 12:00 p.m., B1G+ | | at Penn State | L 34–90 | 15–14 (5–13) | 10 – Senden | 7 – Grocholski | 3 – Battle | Bryce Jordan Center (2,830); University Park, PA |
Big Ten Tournament
| March 6, 2024; 8:00 p.m., Peacock | (11) | vs. (14) Rutgers; First Round | W 77–69 | 16–14 | 32 – Battle | 9 – Holloway | 7 – Battle | Target Center (18,392); Minneapolis, MN |
| March 7, 2024; 8:00 p.m., BTN | (11) | vs. (6) Michigan; Second Round | L 57–76 | 16–15 | 22 – Battle | 17 – Heyer | 3 – Tied | Target Center (18,392); Minneapolis, MN |
WNIT
| March 26, 2024*; 8:00 p.m. | | Pacific; Second Round | W 77–62 | 17–15 | 14 – Hart | 6 – Tied | 6 – Battle | Williams Arena (1,140); Minneapolis, MN |
| March 29, 2024*; 7:00 p.m. | | North Dakota State; Super 16 | W 69–65 | 18–15 | 16 – Grocholski | 12 – Heyer | 5 – Battle | Williams Arena (2,367); Minneapolis, MN |
| April 1, 2024*; 7:30 p.m. | | at Wyoming; Great 8 | W 65–54 | 19–15 | 29 – Battle | 11 – Grocholski | 4 – Battle | Arena-Auditorium (3,710); Laramie, WY |
| April 3, 2024*; 6:00 p.m., ESPN+ | | at Troy; Fab 4 | W 74–69 | 20–15 | 18 – Battle | 11 – Hart | 4 – Battle | Trojan Arena (4,333); Troy, AL |
| April 6, 2024*; 2:00 p.m., CBSSN | | vs. Saint Louis; Championship | L 50–69 | 20–16 | 13 – Hart | 11 – Heyer | 4 – Battle | First Community Arena (1,545); Edwardsville, IL |
*Non-conference game. ^{#}Rankings from AP Poll. (#) Tournament seedings in parentheses. All times are in Central Time.

== Rankings ==
Ranking movements Legend: ██ Increase in ranking ██ Decrease in ranking — = Not ranked RV = Received votes
| | Week | | | | | | | | | | | | | | | | | | | |
| Poll | Pre | 1 | 2 | 3 | 4 | 5 | 6 | 7 | 8 | 9 | 10 | 11 | 12 | 13 | 14 | 15 | 16 | 17 | 18 | Final |
|---|---|---|---|---|---|---|---|---|---|---|---|---|---|---|---|---|---|---|---|---|
| AP | — | — | — | — | — | — | RV | RV | RV | — | — | — | — | | | | | | | Not released |
| Coaches | — | — | — | — | — | — | — | — | — | — | — | — | — | | | | | | | |
