= Laila Phelia =

American basketball player (born 2002)

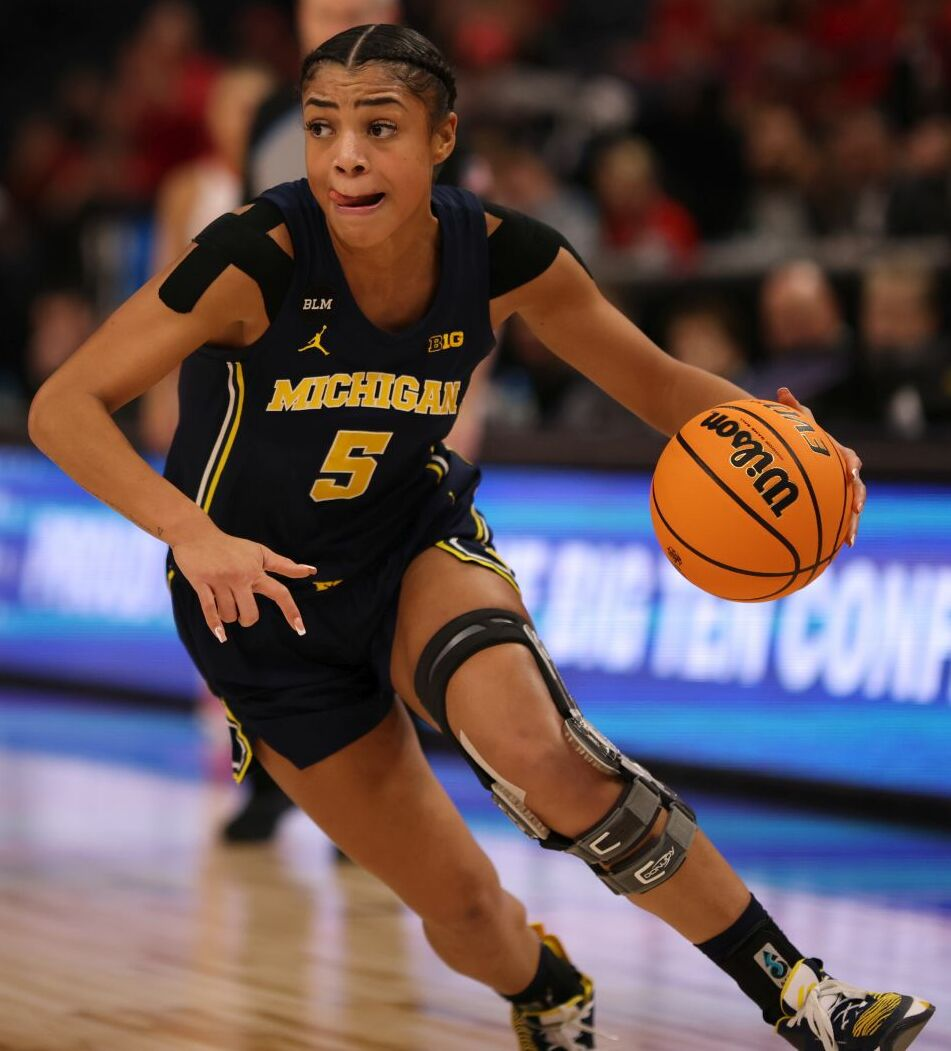
- Phelia with Michigan at the 2023 Big Ten tournament

Personal information
- Born: December 28, 2002 (age 23) Cincinnati, Ohio, U.S.
- Listed height: 6 ft 0 in (1.83 m)

Career information
- High school: Mount Notre Dame (Reading, Ohio)
- College: Michigan (2021–2024); Texas (2024–2025); Syracuse (2025–2026)
- Position: Point guard

Career highlights
- First-team All-Big Ten (2024); Second-team All-Big Ten (2023); Big Ten All-Freshman Team (2022)
- Stats at WNBA.com
- Stats at Basketball Reference
Medals
Women's basketball
Representing United States
FIBA Women's AmeriCup
Silver medal – second place	2023 León	Team

Laila Phelia (born December 28, 2002) is an American basketball player. She played college basketball for Michigan, Texas and Syracuse. She represented the United States at the 2023 FIBA Women's AmeriCup and won a silver medal.

== High school career ==
Phelia played basketball for Mount Notre Dame High School in Reading, Ohio, where she was a four-time Girls Greater Catholic League first-team selection. As a freshman, she started 24 games and averaged 9.7 points and 4.2 rebounds per game. As a sophomore, she averaged 8.9 points and five rebounds per game, and helped lead the Cougars to the Division I state championship in 2019. As a junior, she averaged 13.2 points, 4.5 rebounds, 1.8 steals and 1.1 assists per game and helped lead the Cougars to a perfect 28–0 record and a regional championship before the season was cancelled due to the COVID-19 pandemic. As a senior, she averaged 16.4 points, 3.1 rebounds and 1.8 steals per game and led her team to another state championship in 2021. She finished her high school career on a 72-game winning streak. On April 27, 2020, she verbally committed to play basketball at Michigan. She was ranked No. 28 by ESPN, No. 31 by Blue Star, No. 54 by ASGR and No. 57 by Prospects Nation.

== College career ==
=== Michigan ===
During the 2021–22 season, Phelia appeared in 29 games with 14 starts, and averaged 8.8 points, 2.8 rebounds and 0.8 assists in 22.9 minutes per game. She made her debut on November 9, 2021, in a game against IUPUI and recorded four points and four rebounds. On December 19, 2021, she recorded 12 points, five rebounds, and two steals to help the Wolverines upset No. 5 Baylor, 74–68, in overtime during the Basketball Hall of Fame Women's Showcase. This marked Michigan's first win over a top-five opponent in program history. She was subsequently named the Big Ten's co-freshmen of the week, and the USBWA National Freshman of the Week. On February 6, 2022, she recorded a then career-high 24 points, four rebounds and three assists in a game against Iowa. She scored in double figures nine times during the season. Following the season she was named to the Big Ten All-Freshman team.

During the 2022–23 season, Phelia appeared in 26 games with 24 starts, and averaged 16.7 points and 4.2 rebounds in 33.1 minutes per game. Phelia scored in double figures 23 times with eleven 20-point games. On November 16, 2022, she recorded a career-high 25 points, on 11-of-15 shooting, along with three rebounds, two steals and one block in a game against Western Michigan. On November 27, 2022, during the final of the Gulf Coast Showcase against Baylor, she recorded 20 points and was named to the Gulf Coast Showcase All-Tournament Team. On January 29, 2023, she suffered a leg injury in the final minutes of a game against Minnesota. At the time of her injury, she was the team's best defender and leading scorer. She missed the month of February due to injury and returned on March 2, 2023, during the 2023 Big Ten women's basketball tournament. During the second-round game against Penn State she recorded 13 points and four rebounds. Following the season, she was named to the All-Big Ten second team by both the coaches and media.

During the 2023–24 season, Phelia started 33 games, and averaged 16.8 points, 3.6 rebounds, 2.0 assists and 1.2 steals in 35.0 minutes per game. She led the team in scoring, reached double figures 29 times, with twelve 20-point games and one 30-point game. With 14 points in a game against Maryland on January 24, 2024, Phelia became the 31st player in Michigan program history to surpass 1,000 career points. On February 24, 2024, she recorded her first career double-double, with 16 points, ten rebounds and a career-high seven assists in a game against Northwestern. On March 8, 2024, during the quarterfinals of the 2024 Big Ten women's basketball tournament, she recorded a career-high 30 points in a 69–56 upset victory against No. 12 Indiana. Michigan trailed by as many as 17 points, but Phelia scored 20 points in the second half to help lead the Wolverines to the win. During the Big Ten tournament she averaged 24.6 points and over 37 minutes per game in three tournament games. She was subsequently named to the Big Ten All-Tournament team. During Big Ten conference play, she averaged 17.2 points, while leading the league in minutes played at 36.6 per game. Following the season she was named to the All-Big Ten first team by both the coaches and media.

=== Texas ===
On April 9, 2024, Phelia entered the NCAA transfer portal. On April 22, 2024, she transferred to Texas. She underwent eye surgery after suffering a detached retina during the offseason. During the 2024–25 season, she was limited to eight games, and averaged 6.1 points per game. On February 8, 2025, it was announced she would use a medical redshirt after suffering a season-ending eye injury.

=== Syracuse ===
On April 23, 2025, Phelia entered the NCAA transfer portal for a second time. On May 8, 2025, she transferred to Syracuse.

== National team career ==
On May 15, 2023, Phelia was named to the United States women's national basketball team for the 2023 FIBA Women's AmeriCup. During the tournament she averaged 3.4 points, three rebounds and 1.1 steals in 20.9 minutes per game and won a silver medal. She played the fourth-most minutes on the team and held the second-best plus/minus average at +9.6.

== Career statistics ==
Legend
GP	Games played	GS	Games started	MPG	Minutes per game	RPG	Rebounds per game
APG	Assists per game	SPG	Steals per game	BPG	Blocks per game	PPG	Points per game
TO	Turnovers per game	FG%	Field-goal percentage	3P%	3-point field-goal percentage	FT%	Free-throw percentage
**Bold**	Career best	°	League leader

=== College ===
Year	Team	GP	GS	MPG	FG%	3P%	FT%	RPG	APG	SPG	BPG	TO	PPG
2021–22	Michigan	29	14	22.9	37.5	27.8	78.9	2.8	0.8	0.8	0.1	**1.6**	8.8
2022–23	Michigan	26	24	33.1	43.7	**41.7**	82.9	**4.2**	1.4	**1.4**	**0.5**	2.3	16.7
2023–24	Michigan	**33**	**33**	**35.1**	**42.3**	32.1	80.1	3.6	**2.0**	1.2	0.3	2.1	**16.8**
2024–25	Texas	9	0	19.6	40.5	15.8	**91.3**	2.2	1.0	1.2	0.0	1.2	6.4
**Career**		97	71	29.5	41.6	33.1	81.4	3.4	1.4	1.2	0.3	1.9	13.4
Statistics retrieved from Sports-Reference.

== Personal life ==
Phelia's father, Greg, played basketball at Northern Kentucky from 1989 to 1993 and ranks 17th in program history with 1,310 points.
