= 2023–24 Nebraska Cornhuskers women's basketball team =

Intercollegiate basketball season team

2023–24 Nebraska Cornhuskers women's basketball

NCAA tournament, second round
- Conference: Big Ten Conference
- Record: 23–12 (11–7 Big Ten)
- Head coach: Amy Williams (8th season)
- Assistant coaches: Julian Assibey; Tandem Mays; Jessica Keller
- Home arena: Pinnacle Bank Arena

2023–24 Big Ten women's basketball standings
	Conf.				Overall
Team	W		L	PCT	W		L	PCT
No. 16 Ohio State	16	–	2	.889	26	–	6	.813
No. 2 Iowa †	15	–	3	.833	34	–	5	.872
No. 12 Indiana	15	–	3	.833	26	–	6	.813
Michigan State	12	–	6	.667	22	–	9	.710
Nebraska	11	–	7	.611	23	–	12	.657
Michigan	9	–	9	.500	20	–	14	.588
Penn State	9	–	9	.500	22	–	13	.629
Maryland	9	–	9	.500	19	–	14	.576
Illinois	8	–	10	.444	19	–	15	.559
Wisconsin	6	–	12	.333	15	–	17	.469
Minnesota	5	–	13	.278	20	–	16	.556
Purdue	5	–	13	.278	15	–	19	.441
Northwestern	4	–	14	.222	9	–	21	.300
Rutgers	2	–	16	.111	8	–	24	.250
† 2024 Big Ten tournament winner Rankings from AP Poll

The 2023–24 Nebraska Cornhuskers women's basketball team represented the University of Nebraska–Lincoln during the 2023–24 NCAA Division I women's basketball season. The Cornhuskers, led by eighth-year head coach Amy Williams, played their home games at the Pinnacle Bank Arena in Lincoln, Nebraska as members of the Big Ten Conference.

== Previous season ==
The Cornhuskers finished the 2022–23 season 18–15, 8–10 in Big Ten play, to finish in eighth place. As the #8 seed in the Big Ten tournament, they were defeated by #9 seed Michigan State in the second round. They received an automatic bid into the WNIT, where they defeated Missouri State in the first round, and Northern Iowa in the second round, before falling to eventual WNIT champions Kansas in the Super 16.

== Roster ==
2023–24 Nebraska Cornhuskers women's basketball team
Players
Coaches

Pos.	#	Name	Height	Year	Previous school	Hometown
G	0	Darian White	5 ft 6 in (1.68 m)	GS	Montana State	Boise, ID
G	1	Jaz Shelley	5 ft 9 in (1.75 m)	GS	Oregon	Moe, Australia
G	2	Logan Nissley	6 ft 0 in (1.83 m)	Fr	Bismarck Century High School	Bismarck, ND
G	3	Allison Weidner	5 ft 10 in (1.78 m)	Jr	Humphrey St. Francis High School	Humphrey, NE
F	12	Jessica Petrie	6 ft 2 in (1.88 m)	Fr	Lake Ginninderra College	Gold Coast, Australia
G	14	Callin Hake	5 ft 8 in (1.73 m)	So	Chanhassen High School	Victoria, MN
G	15	Kendall Moriarty	6 ft 1 in (1.85 m)	Jr	Benet Academy	Wheaton, IL
F/C	21	Annika Stewart	6 ft 3 in (1.91 m)	Sr	Wayzata High School	Plymouth, MN
F	22	Natalie Potts	6 ft 2 in (1.88 m)	Fr	Incarnate Word Academy	O'Fallon, MO
G/F	32	Kendall Coley	6 ft 2 in (1.88 m)	Jr	St. Louis Park High School	Minneapolis, MN
F/C	40	Alexis Markowski	6 ft 3 in (1.91 m)	Jr	Pius X High School	Lincoln, NE
G	42	Maddie Krull	5 ft 9 in (1.75 m)	Sr	South Dakota	Omaha, NE

Head coach

- Amy Williams (Nebraska)

Assistant coach(es)

- Julian Assibey (William Penn)
- Tandem Mays (Tulsa)
- Jessica Keller (Quincy)

Legend

- (C) Team captain
- (S) Suspended
- (I) Ineligible
- (W) Walk-on
- Injured
- Current redshirt

Roster
Last update: January 13, 2024

== Schedule and results ==
Date time, TV	Rank^{#}	Opponent^{#}	Result	Record	Site (attendance) city, state
Exhibition
October 29, 2023*; 12:00 p.m.		Dakota Wesleyan	W 83–47		Pinnacle Bank Arena; Lincoln, NE
Regular season
November 6, 2023*; 12:00 p.m., BTN+		Northwestern State	W 90–42	1–0	Pinnacle Bank Arena (7,065); Lincoln, NE
November 10, 2023*; 6:30 p.m.		at Wyoming	W 71–52	2–0	Arena-Auditorium (3,460); Laramie, WY
November 14, 2023*; 7:00 p.m., BTN+		Alcorn State	W 79–32	3–0	Pinnacle Bank Arena (3,917); Lincoln, NE
November 19, 2023*; 1:00 p.m., BTN		No. 22 Creighton	L 74–79	3–1	Pinnacle Bank Arena (6,604); Lincoln, NE
November 23, 2023*; 2:30 p.m.		vs. Lamar; St. Pete Showcase	W 75–61	4–1	McArthur Center (283); St. Petersburg, FL
November 25, 2023*; 12:00 p.m.		vs. TCU; St. Pete Showcase	L 81–88	4–2	McArthur Center (252); St. Petersburg, FL
November 29, 2023*; 7:00 p.m., BTN+		Florida Atlantic	W 77–53	5–2	Pinnacle Bank Arena (3,897); Lincoln, NE
December 2, 2023*; 2:00 p.m., BTN+		Georgia Tech	W 80–72	6–2	Pinnacle Bank Arena (4,578); Lincoln, NE
December 5, 2023*; 7:00 p.m., BTN+		UNC Wilmington	W 108–35	7–2	Pinnacle Bank Arena (3,950); Lincoln, NE
December 9, 2023; 1:00 p.m., BTN		at Michigan State	W 80–74	8–2 (1–0)	Breslin Center (3,194); East Lansing, MI
December 17, 2023*; 12:00 p.m., BTN+		Southern	W 76–51	9–2	Pinnacle Bank Arena (4,488); Lincoln, NE
December 20, 2023*; 6:30 p.m., ESPN+		at Kansas	L 52–69	9–3	Allen Fieldhouse (3,194); Lawrence, KS
December 31, 2023; 1:00 p.m., BTN		Maryland	W 87–81	10–3 (2–0)	Pinnacle Bank Arena (8,795); Lincoln, NE
January 4, 2024; 8:00 p.m., BTN		at Wisconsin	W 69–57	11–3 (3–0)	Kohl Center (2,852); Madison, WI
January 7, 2024; 1:00 p.m., BTN		No. 14 Indiana	L 69–91	11–4 (3–1)	Pinnacle Bank Arena (9,059); Lincoln, NE
January 11, 2024; 7:00 p.m., BTN		Illinois	W 56–48	12–4 (4–1)	Pinnacle Bank Arena (4,040); Lincoln, NE
January 14, 2024; 2:00 p.m., BTN+		at Minnesota	L 58–62	12–5 (4–2)	Williams Arena (5,958); Minneapolis, MN
January 17, 2024; 7:00 p.m., BTN+		Michigan	W 62–43	13–5 (5–2)	Pinnacle Bank Arena (4,398); Lincoln, NE
January 21, 2024; 12:00 p.m., BTN+		at Penn State	L 73–82	13–6 (5–3)	Bryce Jordan Center (2,608); State College, PA
January 27, 2024; 1:00 p.m., BTN		at No. 5 Iowa	L 73–92	13–7 (5–4)	Carver–Hawkeye Arena (14,998); Iowa City, IA
January 31, 2024; 7:00 p.m., BTN+		Purdue	W 68–54	14–7 (6–4)	Pinnacle Bank Arena (4,408); Lincoln, NE
February 3, 2024; 2:00 p.m., BTN+		Rutgers	L 70–71	14–8 (6–5)	Pinnacle Bank Arena (5,831); Lincoln, NE
February 6, 2024; 6:00 p.m., BTN+		at Michigan	W 65–59	15–8 (7–5)	Crisler Center (2,113); Ann Arbor, MI
February 11, 2024; 12:00 p.m., FS1		No. 2 Iowa	W 82–79	16–8 (8–5)	Pinnacle Bank Arena (15,500); Lincoln, NE
February 14, 2024; 6:00 p.m., Peacock		at No. 2 Ohio State	L 47–80	16–9 (8–6)	Value City Arena (7,115); Columbus, OH
February 17, 2024; 3:00 p.m., BTN+		at Purdue	W 77–65	17–9 (9–6)	Mackey Arena (5,205); West Lafayette, IN
February 20, 2024; 8:00 p.m., BTN		Northwestern	W 75–50	18–9 (10–6)	Pinnacle Bank Arena (4,238); Lincoln, NE
February 24, 2024; 4:00 p.m., BTN+		Minnesota	W 70–51	19–9 (11–6)	Pinnacle Bank Arena (7,101); Lincoln, NE
March 3, 2024; 3:00 p.m., BTN		at Illinois	L 73–74	19–10 (11–7)	State Farm Center (4,311); Champaign, IL
Big Ten women's tournament
March 7, 2024; 2:00 p.m., BTN	(5)	vs. (12) Purdue; Second round	W 64–56	20–10	Target Center (18,392); Minneapolis, MN
March 8, 2024; 2:00 p.m., BTN	(5)	vs. (4) Michigan State; Quarterfinals	W 73–61	21–10	Target Center (18,481); Minneapolis, MN
March 9, 2024; 1:00 p.m., BTN	(5)	vs. (8) Maryland; Semifinals	W 78–68	22–10	Target Center; Minneapolis, MN
March 10, 2024; 11:00 a.m., CBS	(5)	vs. (2) No. 3 Iowa; Championship	L 89–94 ^{OT}	22–11	Target Center (18,534); Minneapolis, MN
NCAA tournament
March 22, 2024*; 9:30 p.m., ESPNU	(6 A1)	vs. (11 A1) Texas A&M; First round	W 61–59	23–11	Gill Coliseum; Corvallis, OR
March 24, 2024*; 3:00 p.m., ESPN	(6 A1)	at (3 A1) No. 12 Oregon State; Second round	L 51–61	23–12	Gill Coliseum (7,227); Corvallis, OR
*Non-conference game. ^{#}Rankings from AP poll. (#) Tournament seedings in parentheses. A1=Albany 1. All times are in Central.

== See also ==
- 2023–24 Nebraska Cornhuskers men's basketball team
