= 2023–24 Michigan Wolverines women's basketball team =

Intercollegiate basketball season

2023–24 Michigan Wolverines women's basketball

NCAA tournament, First round
- Conference: Big Ten Conference
- Record: 20–14 (9–9 Big Ten)
- Head coach: Kim Barnes Arico (12th season)
- Assistant coaches: Melanie Moore; Harry Rafferty; Jillian Dunston; Ariel Atkins
- Home arena: Crisler Center

2023–24 Big Ten women's basketball standings
	Conf.				Overall
Team	W		L	PCT	W		L	PCT
No. 16 Ohio State	16	–	2	.889	26	–	6	.813
No. 2 Iowa †	15	–	3	.833	34	–	5	.872
No. 12 Indiana	15	–	3	.833	26	–	6	.813
Michigan State	12	–	6	.667	22	–	9	.710
Nebraska	11	–	7	.611	23	–	12	.657
Michigan	9	–	9	.500	20	–	14	.588
Penn State	9	–	9	.500	22	–	13	.629
Maryland	9	–	9	.500	19	–	14	.576
Illinois	8	–	10	.444	19	–	15	.559
Wisconsin	6	–	12	.333	15	–	17	.469
Minnesota	5	–	13	.278	20	–	16	.556
Purdue	5	–	13	.278	15	–	19	.441
Northwestern	4	–	14	.222	9	–	21	.300
Rutgers	2	–	16	.111	8	–	24	.250
† 2024 Big Ten tournament winner Rankings from AP Poll

The 2023–24 Michigan Wolverines women's basketball team represented the University of Michigan during the 2023–24 NCAA Division I women's basketball season. The Wolverines were led by head coach Kim Barnes Arico in her twelfth year, and played their home games at the Crisler Center. This season marked the program's 42nd season as a member of the Big Ten Conference.

== Previous season ==
The Wolverines finished the 2022–23 season with a 23–10 record, including 11–7 in Big Ten play to finish in fourth place. They were ranked the No. 6 seed in the 2023 NCAA Tournament, and advanced to the second round, before being eliminated by eventual national champion LSU.

== Offseason ==
On March 20, 2023, former assistant coach Erin Batth was named head coach for Providence. On March 27, former assistant coach Valerie Nainima followed Batth and joined Providence's coaching staff as an assistant coach. On March 30, Michigan named Melanie Moore an assistant coach. On April 17, Jillian Dunston was named an assistant coach for the Wolverines, returning to her alma mater.

=== Departures ===
Michigan Departures
Name	Number	Pos.	Weight	Year	Hometown	Reason for departure
Maddie Nolan	3	G	5'9"	Senior	Zionsville, IN	Transferred to Colorado
Ari Wiggins	12	G	5'8"	Sophomore	Indianapolis, IN	Transferred to Butler
Kate Clarke	13	G	6'1"	Freshman	Carmel, IN	Transferred to DePaul
Michelle Sidor	24	G	5'8"	Senior	Upper Saddle River, NJ	Transferred to DePaul
Leigha Brown	32	F	6'1"	Graduate student	Auburn, IN	Graduated
Emily Kiser	33	F	6'3"	Graduate student	Noblesville, IN	Graduated
Izabel Varejão	34	C	6'4"	Senior	Vitória, Brazil	Transferred to Syracuse

=== Incoming transfers ===
Michigan incoming transfers
Name	Number	Pos.	Height	Year	Hometown	Previous team
Elissa Brett	0	G	5'10"	Graduate student	Adelaide, Australia	Bowling Green
Lauren Hansen	1	G	5'8"	Graduate student	Long Island, NY	Missouri
Taylor Williams	33	F	6'2"	Graduate student	New Baltimore, MI	Western Michigan

== Roster ==
2023–24 Michigan Wolverines women's basketball team
Players
Coaches

Pos.	#	Name	Height	Year	Previous school	Hometown
G	0	Elissa Brett	5 ft 10 in (1.78 m)	GS	Bowling Green	Adelaide, Australia
G	1	Lauren Hansen	5 ft 8 in (1.73 m)	GS	Missouri	Long Island, NY
G	2	Macy Brown	5 ft 8 in (1.73 m)	Fr	East Grand Rapids HS	East Grand Rapids, MI
G	5	Laila Phelia	6 ft 0 in (1.83 m)	Jr	Mount Notre Dame HS	Cincinnati, OH
G	10	Jordan Hobbs	6 ft 3 in (1.91 m)	Jr	Springboro HS	Springboro, OH
G	11	Greta Kampschroeder	6 ft 0 in (1.83 m)	Jr	Naperville North HS	Naperville, IL
F	20	Alyssa Crockett	6 ft 2 in (1.88 m)	So	Westfield HS	Westfield, IN
F	21	Taylor Woodson	6 ft 0 in (1.83 m)	Fr	Hopkins HS	Minnetonka, MN
F	22	Chyra Evans	6 ft 2 in (1.88 m)	So	Lake Ginninderra HS	Newcastle, Australia
F	25	Whitney Sollom	6 ft 4 in (1.93 m)	Sr	Hartland HS	Hartland, MI
F	30	Elise Stuck	6 ft 1 in (1.85 m)	Sr	Charlevoix HS	Charlevoix, MI
F	33	Taylor Williams	6 ft 2 in (1.88 m)	GS	Western Michigan	New Baltimore, MI
F	44	Cameron Williams	6 ft 3 in (1.91 m)	Sr	Whitney Young HS	Chicago, IL

Head coach

- Kim Barnes Arico (alum: Montclair State)

Assistant coach(es)

- Melanie Moore (Siena)
- Harry Rafferty (Michigan)
- Jillian Dunston (Michigan)
- Ariel Atkins (Texas)

Legend

- (C) Team captain
- (S) Suspended
- (I) Ineligible
- (W) Walk-on
- Injured
- Current redshirt

Roster

== Schedule and results ==
Date time, TV	Rank^{#}	Opponent^{#}	Result	Record	Site (attendance) city, state
Exhibition
November 2, 2023*; 7:00 p.m., BTN+		Saginaw Valley State	W 95–41	–	Crisler Center (1,024); Ann Arbor, MI
Regular season
November 6, 2023*; 7:00 p.m., BTN+		Purdue Fort Wayne	W 80–61	1–0	Crisler Center (2,389); Ann Arbor, MI
November 14, 2023*; 7:00 p.m., BTN+		Oakland	W 80–39	2–0	Crisler Center (2,307); Ann Arbor, MI
November 18, 2023*; 5:00 p.m., FloHoops		vs. Middle Tennessee; Battle 4 Atlantis quarterfinals	W 63–49	3–0	Imperial Arena (393); Nassau, Bahamas
November 19, 2023*; 2:30 p.m., FloHoops		vs. South Dakota; Battle 4 Atlantis semifinals	W 70–52	4–0	Imperial Arena (222); Nassau, Bahamas
November 20, 2023*; 12:00 p.m., ESPN2		vs. No. 24 Ole Miss; Battle 4 Atlantis championship	L 49–60	4–1	Imperial Arena; Nassau, Bahamas
November 24, 2023*; 1:00 p.m., BTN+		Eastern Michigan	W 80–44	5–1	Crisler Center (4,052); Ann Arbor, MI
November 29, 2023; 7:00 p.m., BTN+		SIU Edwardsville	W 103–59	6–1	Crisler Center (2,145); Ann Arbor, MI
December 2, 2023*; 2:00 p.m., ESPN+		at Harvard	W 80–66	7–1	Lavietes Pavilion (1,636); Boston, MA
December 6, 2023*; 5:00 p.m., CBSSN		at Toledo	L 46–69	7–2	Savage Arena (7,082); Toledo, OH
December 10, 2023; 3:00 p.m., BTN+		at Illinois	W 84–48	8–2 (1–0)	State Farm Center (3,763); Champaign, IL
December 16, 2023*; 11:00 a.m., BTN+		Miami (OH)	W 75–49	9–2	Crisler Center (3,065); Ann Arbor, MI
December 20, 2023; 6:30 p.m., ESPN2		vs. Florida; Jumpman Invitational	L 65–82	9–3	Spectrum Center; Charlotte, NC
December 22, 2023*; 2:00 p.m., BTN+		Florida A&M	W 77–35	10–3	Crisler Center (2,308); Ann Arbor, MI
December 30, 2023; 12:00 p.m., Fox		No. 17 Ohio State; Rivalry	W 69–60	11–3 (2–0)	Crisler Center (8,078); Ann Arbor, MI
January 4, 2024; 7:00 p.m., BTN		at No. 14 Indiana	L 59–80	11–4 (2–1)	Simon Skjodt Assembly Hall (8,723); Bloomington, IN
January 9, 2024; 8:00 p.m., BTN		Minnesota	L 66–82	11–5 (2–2)	Crisler Center (2,112); Ann Arbor, MI
January 13, 2024; 2:00 p.m., BTN+		Wisconsin	W 76–52	12–5 (3–2)	Crisler Center (4,906); Ann Arbor, MI
January 17, 2024; 8:00 p.m., BTN+		at Nebraska	L 43–62	12–6 (3–3)	Pinnacle Bank Arena (4,398); Lincoln, NE
January 21, 2024; 2:00 p.m., BTN+		at Rutgers	W 56–50	13–6 (4–3)	Jersey Mike's Arena (4,647); Piscataway, NJ
January 24, 2024; 7:00 p.m., BTN+		Maryland	W 79–77 ^{OT}	14–6 (5–3)	Crisler Center (2,586); Ann Arbor, MI
January 27, 2024; 12:00 p.m., BTN+		at Michigan State; Rivalry	L 61–82	14–7 (5–4)	Breslin Center (9,385); East Lansing, MI
January 31, 2024; 7:00 p.m., BTN+		Illinois	L 64–77	14–8 (5–5)	Crisler Center (2,522); Ann Arbor, MI
February 3, 2024; 6:00 p.m., BTN		at Penn State	W 80–75	15–8 (6–5)	Bryce Jordan Center (4,745); State College, PA
February 6, 2024; 7:00 p.m., BTN+		Nebraska	L 59–65	15–9 (6–6)	Crisler Center (2,113); Ann Arbor, MI
February 10, 2024; 2:00 p.m., BTN		Rutgers	W 86–58	16–9 (7–6)	Crisler Center (4,238); Ann Arbor, MI
February 15, 2024; 8:00 p.m., Peacock		at No. 4 Iowa	L 89–106	16–10 (7–7)	Carver–Hawkeye Arena (14,998); Iowa City, IA
February 18, 2024; 12:00 p.m., BTN		Michigan State; Rivalry	L 66–70	16–11 (7–8)	Crisler Center (10,461); Ann Arbor, MI
February 24, 2024; 3:00 p.m., BTN+		at Northwestern	W 74–60	17–11 (8–8)	Welsh–Ryan Arena (2,942); Evanston, IL
February 28, 2024; 7:00 p.m., Peacock		at No. 2 Ohio State; Rivalry	L 51–67	17–12 (8–9)	Value City Arena (10,895); Columbus, OH
March 3, 2024; 7:00 p.m., FS1		Purdue	W 64–60	18–12 (9–9)	Crisler Center (3,202); Ann Arbor, MI
Big Ten Women's Tournament
March 7, 2024; 9:00 p.m., BTN	(6)	vs. (11) Minnesota; Second round	W 76–57	19–12	Target Center (18,392); Minneapolis, MN
March 8, 2024; 9:00 p.m., BTN	(6)	vs. (3) No. 12 Indiana; Quarterfinal	W 69–56	20–12	Target Center (18,575); Minneapolis, MN
March 9, 2024; 4:30 p.m., BTN	(6)	vs. (2) No. 3 Iowa; Semifinal	L 68–95	20–13	Target Center (18,746); Minneapolis, MN
NCAA Women's Tournament
March 23, 2024*; 2:00 p.m., ESPNews	(9 P3)	vs. (8 P3) Kansas; First round	L 72–81 ^{OT}	20–14	Galen Center (4,318); Los Angeles, CA
*Non-conference game. ^{#}Rankings from AP poll. (#) Tournament seedings in parentheses. P3=Portland 3. All times are in Eastern Time. Source:

== Rankings ==
Ranking movements Legend: ██ Increase in ranking ██ Decrease in ranking — = Not ranked RV = Received votes т = Tied with team above or below
	Week																			
Poll	Pre	1	2	3	4	5	6	7	8	9	10	11	12	13	14	15	16	17	18	Final
AP	—	—	RV	—	RV	—	—	—	RV	—	—	—	—	—	—	—	—	—		Not released
Coaches	25т	RV	RV	RV	25	RV	RV	RV	RV	RV	—	—	—	—	—	—	—	—		
