= 2023–24 Penn State Lady Lions basketball team =

Intercollegiate basketball season

2023–24 Penn State Lady Lions basketball

WBIT, semifinals
- Conference: Big Ten Conference
- Record: 22–13 (9–9 Big Ten)
- Head coach: Carolyn Kieger (5th season)
- Assistant coaches: Terri Williams; Sharnee Zoll-Norman; Tiffany Swoffard; Pam Brown; Natisha Hiedeman
- Home arena: Bryce Jordan Center

2023–24 Big Ten women's basketball standings
	Conf.				Overall
Team	W		L	PCT	W		L	PCT
No. 16 Ohio State	16	–	2	.889	26	–	6	.813
No. 2 Iowa †	15	–	3	.833	34	–	5	.872
No. 12 Indiana	15	–	3	.833	26	–	6	.813
Michigan State	12	–	6	.667	22	–	9	.710
Nebraska	11	–	7	.611	23	–	12	.657
Michigan	9	–	9	.500	20	–	14	.588
Penn State	9	–	9	.500	22	–	13	.629
Maryland	9	–	9	.500	19	–	14	.576
Illinois	8	–	10	.444	19	–	15	.559
Wisconsin	6	–	12	.333	15	–	17	.469
Minnesota	5	–	13	.278	20	–	16	.556
Purdue	5	–	13	.278	15	–	19	.441
Northwestern	4	–	14	.222	9	–	21	.300
Rutgers	2	–	16	.111	8	–	24	.250
† 2024 Big Ten tournament winner Rankings from AP Poll

The 2023–24 Penn State Lady Lions basketball team represented Pennsylvania State University during the 2023–24 NCAA Division I women's basketball season. The Lady Lions were led by fifth-year head coach Carolyn Kieger and played their home games at the Bryce Jordan Center in State College, Pennsylvania as members of the Big Ten Conference.

== Previous season ==
The Lady Lions finished the season 9–15 and 6–12 in Big Ten play, to finish in a tie for twelfth place. As the 13th seed in the Big Ten tournament, they defeated Minnesota in the first round before losing to Michigan in the second round.

== Offseason ==
=== Departures ===
Name	Number	Pos.	Height	Year	Hometown	Reason for departure
Ivane Tensaie	0	G	5' 7"	Sophomore	Roseville, MN	Transferred to UTEP
Aicha Dia	2	F	6' 1"	Freshman	Montreal, QC	Transferred to Cincinnati
Ymke Brouwer	3	F	6' 0"	(redshirt) Freshman	Zürich, Switzerland	Transferred to Manhattan
Anna Camden	11	F	6' 3"	Senior	Downingtown, PA	Graduate transferred to Richmond
Kayla Thomas	12	F	6' 3"	Sophomore	Beltsville, MD	Transferred to Georgia Southern
Taniyah Thompson	23	G	5' 11"	Senior	Hamden, CT	Graduate transferred to Georgia
Alexa Williamson	24	F	6' 2"	GS senior	Houston, PA	Graduated
Johnasia Cash	33	F	6' 3"	GS senior	McKeesport, PA	Graduated

=== Incoming transfers ===
Name	Number	Pos.	Height	Year	Hometown	Previous school
Ashley Owusu	0	G	6' 0"	GS senior	Woodbridge, VA	Virginia Tech
Taylor Valladay	2	G	5' 7"	GS senior	Chicago, IL	Virginia

==== Recruiting ====
There was no recruiting class of 2023.

== Roster ==
2023–24 Penn State Nittany Lions women's basketball team
Players
Coaches

Pos.	#	Name	Height	Year	Previous school	Hometown
F	1	Ali Brigham	6 ft 4 in (1.93 m)	So	Franklin/George Mason	Franklin, MA
F	3	Ymke Brouwer	6 ft 0 in (1.83 m)	Fr	United School of Sports	Zürich, Switzerland
G	4	Niya Beverly	5 ft 7 in (1.7 m)	GS	St. John's College/Wisconsin	Laurel, MD
G	5	Leilani Kapinus	5 ft 10 in (1.78 m)	RS Fr	James Madison Memorial	Madison, WI
G	10	Tova Sabel	5 ft 10 in (1.78 m)	So	Bromma Gymnasium	Stockholm, Sweden
F	11	Anna Camden	6 ft 3 in (1.91 m)	Jr	Shipley	Downingtown, PA
F	12	Kayla Thomas	6 ft 3 in (1.91 m)	Fr	Emerge Christian Academy	Beltsville, MD
G	15	Maddie Burke	6 ft 0 in (1.83 m)	So	Central Bucks West	Doylestown, PA
G	20	Makenna Marisa	5 ft 11 in (1.8 m)	Jr	Peters Township	McMurray, PA
G	22	Alli Campbell	6 ft 0 in (1.83 m)	So	Bellwood-Antis/Notre Dame	Altoona, PA
G	23	Shay Hagans	5 ft 6 in (1.68 m)	Jr	Osbourn Park	Manassas, VA
G	24	Nan Garcia	6 ft 0 in (1.83 m)	Fr	Jeffersonville	Jeffersonville, IN
G	25	Kelly Jekot	6 ft 0 in (1.83 m)	GS	Cumberland Valley/Villanova	Enola, PA

Head coach

- Carolyn Kieger (Marquette)

Assistant coach(es)

- Terri Williams (Penn State)
- Sharnee Zoll-Norman (Virginia)
- Tiffany Swoffard (Austin Peay)
- Pam Brown (Charlotte)
- Natisha Hiedeman (Marquette)

Legend

- (C) Team captain
- (S) Suspended
- (I) Ineligible
- (W) Walk-on
- Injured
- Current redshirt

Roster
Last update: October 7, 2024

== Schedule and results ==
Date time, TV	Rank^{#}	Opponent^{#}	Result	Record	Site (attendance) city, state
Regular season
November 7, 2023*; 6:00 p.m., BTN+		Bucknell	W 94–51	1–0	Bryce Jordan Center (1,977); State College, PA
November 10, 2023*; 5:00 p.m., BTN+		Navy	W 107–44	2–0	Bryce Jordan Center (2,127); State College, PA
November 13, 2023*; 6:00 p.m., BTN		Kansas	W 91–85	3–0	Bryce Jordan Center (1,938); State College, PA
November 16, 2023*; 7:00 p.m., FloSports		at St. John's	W 69–53	4–0	Carnesecca Arena (396); Queens, NY
November 20, 2023*; 6:30 p.m., FloSports		vs. Oklahoma State; Baha Mar Pink Flamingo Championship	W 89–80	5–0	Baha Mar Convention Center (364); Nassau, Bahamas
November 22, 2023*; 9:00 p.m., FloSports		vs. No. 8 USC; Baha Mar Pink Flamingo Championship	L 70–71	5–1	Baha Mar Convention Center (297); Nassau, Bahamas
November 26, 2023*; 1:00 p.m., BTN+		Providence	W 73–66	6–1	Bryce Jordan Center (2,206); State College, PA
November 29, 2023*; 6:00 p.m., BTN+		Radford	W 97–47	7–1	Bryce Jordan Center (1,830); State College, PA
December 4, 2023*; 6:00 p.m., ESPN+	No. 25	at West Virginia	L 65–83	7–2	WVU Coliseum (2,061); Morgantown, WV
December 10, 2023; 1:00 p.m., BTN+	No. 25	at No. 12 Ohio State	L 84–94 ^{OT}	7–3 (0–1)	Value City Arena (6,062); Columbus, OH
December 17, 2023*; 1:00 p.m., BTN+		Saint Francis	W 119–43	8–3	Bryce Jordan Center (1,929); State College, PA
December 20, 2023*; 11:30 a.m., BTN+		Central Connecticut	W 101–73	9–3	Bryce Jordan Center (2,764); State College, PA
December 30, 2023; 4:00 p.m., BTN		Michigan State	L 87–98	9–4 (0–2)	Bryce Jordan Center (2,967); State College, PA
January 2, 2024; 6:00 p.m., BTN+		Northwestern	W 95–55	10–4 (1–2)	Bryce Jordan Center (1,730); State College, PA
January 10, 2024; 7:00 p.m., BTN+		at No. 14 Indiana	L 68–75	10–5 (1–3)	Simon Skjodt Assembly Hall (8,516); Bloomington, IN
January 14, 2024; 2:00 p.m., BTN+		at Rutgers	W 94–80	11–5 (2–3)	Jersey Mike's Arena (6,938); Piscataway, NJ
January 18, 2024; 7:00 p.m., BTN		Purdue	W 80–67	12–5 (3–3)	Bryce Jordan Center (2,266); State College, PA
January 21, 2024; 1:00 p.m., BTN+		Nebraska	W 82–73	13–5 (4–3)	Bryce Jordan Center (2,608); State College, PA
January 25, 2024; 8:00 p.m., BTN		at Northwestern	W 76–65	14–5 (5–3)	Welsh–Ryan Arena (1,664); Evanston, IL
January 28, 2024; 1:00 p.m., BTN+		Maryland	W 112–76	15–5 (6–3)	Bryce Jordan Center (3,532); State College, PA
January 31, 2024; 8:00 p.m., BTN+		at Minnesota	W 80–64	16–5 (7–3)	Williams Arena (3,319); Minneapolis, MN
February 3, 2024; 6:00 p.m., BTN		Michigan	L 75–80	16–6 (7–4)	Bryce Jordan Center (4,745); State College, PA
February 8, 2024; 9:00 p.m., BTN		at No. 2 Iowa	L 93–111	16–7 (7–5)	Carver–Hawkeye Arena (14,998); Iowa City, IA
February 11, 2024; 3:00 p.m., BTN+		at Wisconsin	L 64–69	16–8 (7–6)	Kohl Center (4,519); Madison, WI
February 15, 2024; 6:00 p.m., BTN+		Illinois	L 71–86	16–9 (7–7)	Bryce Jordan Center (2,376); State College, PA
February 18, 2024; 1:00 p.m., BTN+		at Maryland	L 62–77	16–10 (7–8)	Xfinity Center (9,443); College Park, MD
February 22, 2024; 6:00 p.m., BTN		No. 2 Ohio State; Return to Rec	L 69–82	16–11 (7–9)	Rec Hall (2,501); State College, PA
February 28, 2024; 7:00 p.m., BTN+		at Purdue	W 93–88	17–11 (8–9)	Mackey Arena (4,593); West Lafayette, IN
March 3, 2024; 1:00 p.m., BTN+		Minnesota	W 90–34	18–11 (9–9)	Bryce Jordan Center (2,830); State College, PA
Big Ten women's tournament
March 7, 2024; 6:30 p.m., BTN	(7)	vs. (10) Wisconsin; Second round	W 80–56	19–11	Target Center (18,392); Minneapolis, MN
March 8, 2024; 6:30 p.m., BTN	(7)	vs. (2) No. 3 Iowa; Quarterfinals	L 62–95	19–12	Target Center (18,481); Minneapolis, MN
WBIT
March 21, 2024*; 6:00 p.m., ESPN+	(1)	George Mason; First round	W 84–80 ^{OT}	20–12	Bryce Jordan Center (1,635); State College, PA
March 25, 2024*; 6:00 p.m., ESPN+	(1)	Belmont; Second round	W 74–66	21–12	Bryce Jordan Center (1,666); State College, PA
March 28, 2024*; 6:00 p.m., ESPN+	(1)	(2) Mississippi State; Quarterfinals	W 92–87	22–12	Bryce Jordan Center (1,823); State College, PA
April 1, 2024*; 6:00 p.m., ESPNU	(1)	vs. (1) Villanova; Semifinals	L 53–58	22–13	Hinkle Fieldhouse (1,748); Indianapolis, IN
*Non-conference game. ^{#}Rankings from AP poll. (#) Tournament seedings in parentheses. All times are in Eastern.

== Rankings ==
Ranking movements Legend: ██ Increase in ranking ██ Decrease in ranking — = Not ranked RV = Received votes
	Week																				
Poll	Pre	1	2	3	4	5	6	7	8	9	10	11	12	13	14	15	16	17	18	19	Final
AP	—	—	—	RV	25	RV	—	RV	—	—	—	—	RV	—	—	—	—	—	—	—	Not released
Coaches	—	—	—	—	RV	—	—	—	—	—	—	—	—	—	—	—	—	—	—	—	

Legend
	Increase in ranking
	Decrease in ranking
	Not ranked previous week
(RV)	Received votes
(NR)	Not ranked and did not receive votes
т	Tied with team above or below also with this symbol

The Coaches Poll did not release a Week 2 poll, and the AP poll did not release a poll after the NCAA tournament.
