= 2023–24 Illinois Fighting Illini women's basketball team =

Intercollegiate basketball season

2023–24 Illinois Fighting Illini women's basketball

WBIT champions
- Conference: Big Ten Conference
- Record: 19–15 (8–10 Big Ten)
- Head coach: Shauna Green (2nd season)
- Associate head coach: Calamity McEntire
- Assistant coaches: DeAntoine Beasley; Britney Anderson
- Home arena: State Farm Center

2023–24 Big Ten women's basketball standings
	Conf.				Overall
Team	W		L	PCT	W		L	PCT
No. 16 Ohio State	16	–	2	.889	26	–	6	.813
No. 2 Iowa †	15	–	3	.833	34	–	5	.872
No. 12 Indiana	15	–	3	.833	26	–	6	.813
Michigan State	12	–	6	.667	22	–	9	.710
Nebraska	11	–	7	.611	23	–	12	.657
Michigan	9	–	9	.500	20	–	14	.588
Penn State	9	–	9	.500	22	–	13	.629
Maryland	9	–	9	.500	19	–	14	.576
Illinois	8	–	10	.444	19	–	15	.559
Wisconsin	6	–	12	.333	15	–	17	.469
Minnesota	5	–	13	.278	20	–	16	.556
Purdue	5	–	13	.278	15	–	19	.441
Northwestern	4	–	14	.222	9	–	21	.300
Rutgers	2	–	16	.111	8	–	24	.250
† 2024 Big Ten tournament winner Rankings from AP Poll

The 2023–24 Illinois Fighting Illini women's basketball team represented the University of Illinois during the 2023–24 NCAA Division I women's basketball season. The Fighting Illini were led by second-year head coach Shauna Green, and they played their home games at State Farm Center. This season marked the program's 42nd season as a member of the Big Ten Conference.

== Previous season ==
The Illini finished the 2022–23 season 22–10 overall, with a 11–7 record in Big Ten play to finish in sixth place. As the sixth seed in the Big Ten women's tournament, they defeated eleventh seed Rutgers in the first round before losing to third seed Maryland in the second round.

The team was invited to the 2023 NCAA Division I women's basketball tournament as one of the First Four teams to play, losing to Mississippi State. This marked their first appearance in the NCAA tournament since 2003.

The Illini's turnaround in 2022–23 was considered "remarkable" given the program's history since 2003. The 2022–23 team broke multiple records and streaks, including their first 6–0 start to a season since 1986–87, and their first six-game winning streak since 2009. They finished the non-conference portion of their schedule with a 10–1 record. The team won four straight conference games from December 7, 2022, through January 1, 2023, including a dramatic victory over eventual national champion runner-up Iowa; this conference winning streak tied the fourth best streak in program history.

On January 8, 2023, the Illini earned a spot in the AP Top-25 poll for the first time since 2000. Their 11–7 conference record was its most in league play since 1999–2000, and their 10-win improvement in conference games matched the largest turnaround in Big Ten history.

On December 19, 2022, coach Green was named the ESPN Women's Basketball Coach of the Week. In the post-season, transfer player Makira Cook earned First-team All-Big Ten honors, the first Illini to be named to that team since 2010. Cook was also named to the Associated Press' All-American Honorable Mention list, the first Illini to make that list since 2013. Players Kendall Bostic and Genesis Bryant were named to the All-Big Ten second team, and Adalia McKenzie received an All-Big Ten honorable mention; these conference honors marked the first time since the 1986–87 season that four Illinois players earned all-conference accolades.

== Off-season ==
Assistant coach Ryan Gensler left the Illinois program on March 29, 2023, to become the head women's basketball coach at the University of Akron. On April 20, 2023, Green announced that former Stanford University assistant coach Britney Anderson had been hired as an assistant coach at Illinois.

Two non-starting players from the 2022–23 Illinois team, Jayla Oden and Liisa Taponen, entered the NCAA transfer portal after the end of the season and moved on to other programs, and Geovana Lopes exhausted her collegiate eligibility.

The Illini added two players from the transfer portal, center Camille Hobby from North Carolina State University and forward Shay Bollin from Duke University. They also added freshmen guards Cori Allen and Gretchen Dolan to the roster.

All five of the 2022–23 starting lineup returned for the 2023–24 season. The team was ranked number 23 in the Associated Press preseason Top 25, their first preseason ranking since 1999.

=== Departures ===
Departures
Name	Number	Pos.	Height	Year	Hometown	Reason for departure
Geovanna Lopes	0	F/C	6'3"	Graduate student	Bataguassu, Brazil	Graduated
Jayla Oden	12	G	5'9"	Sophomore	Baltimore, MD	Transferred to Penn State
Liisa Taponen	13	C	6'5"	Freshman	Tampere, Finland	Transferred to Akron

=== Incoming transfers ===
Incoming transfers
Name	Number	Pos.	Height	Year	Hometown	Previous school
Shay Bollin	22	G	5'10"	Sophomore	Raynham, MA	Duke
Camille Hobby	41	C	6'3"	Graduate Student	Jacksonville, FL	NC State

=== 2023 recruiting class ===
2023 recruiting class
Name	Number	Pos.	Height	Year	Hometown	High school
Cori Allen	2	G	5'10"	Freshman	Nashville, TN	Montverde Academy
Gretchen Dolan	4	G	5'11"	Freshman	Buffalo, NY	Williamsville South High School

== Roster ==
2023–24 Illinois Fighting Illini women's basketball team
Players
Coaches

Pos.	#	Name	Height	Year	Previous school	Hometown
G	0	Camille Jackson	5 ft 11 in (1.8 m)	So	Butler College Prep	Chicago, IL
G	1	Genesis Bryant	5 ft 6 in (1.68 m)	Sr	North Carolina State	Jonesboro, GA
G	2	Cori Allen	5 ft 10 in (1.78 m)	Fr	Montverde Academy	Nashville, TN
G	3	Makira Cook	5 ft 6 in (1.68 m)	Sr	Dayton	Cincinnati, OH
G	4	Kam'Ren Rhodes	5 ft 6 in (1.68 m)	So	Arizona Compass Prep	Chandler, AZ
G	5	Gretchen Dolan	5 ft 11 in (1.8 m)	Fr	Williamsville South High School	Buffalo, NY
G	11	Jada Peebles	5 ft 10 in (1.78 m)	GS	Wakefield	Raleigh, NC
C	21	Aicha Ndour	6 ft 6 in (1.98 m)	Sr	Northwest Florida State College	Somone, Senegal
F	22	Shay Bollin	6 ft 3 in (1.91 m)	So	Duke	Raynham, MA
F	23	Brynn Shoup-Hill	6 ft 3 in (1.91 m)	Jr	Dayton	Goshen, IN
G	24	Adalia McKenzie	5 ft 10 in (1.78 m)	Jr	Park Center	Brooklyn Park, MN
F	33	Samantha Dewey	6 ft 2 in (1.88 m)	So	Brooks School	North Andover, MA
C	41	Camille Hobby	6 ft 3 in (1.91 m)	GS	North Carolina State	Jacksonville, FL
F	44	Kendall Bostic	6 ft 2 in (1.88 m)	Sr	Michigan State	Kokomo, IN

Head coach

- Shauna Green (Canisius)

Assistant coach(es)

- Calamity McEntire (Eastern Oklahoma State)
- DeAntoine Beasley (Tennessee Tech)
- Britney Anderson (Virginia Tech)

Legend

- (C) Team captain
- (S) Suspended
- (I) Ineligible
- (W) Walk-on
- Injured
- Current redshirt

Roster

== Schedule and results ==
Date time, TV	Rank^{#}	Opponent^{#}	Result	Record	Site (attendance) city, state
Exhibition
October 30, 2023*; 6:00 p.m., B1G+	No. 23	Truman	W 121–60	0–0	State Farm Center (2,598); Champaign, IL
Regular season
November 7, 2023*; 6:00 p.m., B1G+	No. 23	Morehead State	W 81–61	1–0	State Farm Center (2,680); Champaign, IL
November 11, 2023*; 2:00 p.m., FloHoops	No. 23	at Marquette	L 67–71	1–1	Al McGuire Center (1,428); Milwaukee, WI
November 15, 2023*; 11:00 a.m., B1G+		Saint Peter's	W 103–33	2–1	State Farm Center (11,563); Champaign, IL
November 18, 2023*; 12:00 p.m., NBC		vs. No. 16 Notre Dame; Citi Shamrock Classic	L 68–79	2–2	Entertainment and Sports Arena (N/A); Washington, D.C.
November 26, 2023*; 1:00 p.m., B1G+		Canisius	W 90–58	3–2	State Farm Center (2,962); Champaign, IL
November 29, 2023*; 6:00 p.m., B1G+		Central Connecticut	W 89–50	4–2	State Farm Center (2,743); Champaign, IL
December 6, 2023*; 6:00 p.m., B1G+		Northern Kentucky	W 74–52	5–2	State Farm Center (2,869); Champaign, IL
December 10, 2023; 2:00 p.m., B1G+		Michigan	L 48–84	5–3 (0–1)	State Farm Center (3,763); Champaign, IL
December 17, 2023*; 3:00 p.m., BTN		Missouri; McBride Homes Braggin' Rights	L 66–69	5–4	State Farm Center (4,790); Champaign, IL
December 20, 2023*; 10:00 a.m., FloHoops		vs. Arkansas; West Palm Beach Classic	L 59–60	5–5	Massimino Court (N/A); West Palm Beach, FL
December 21, 2023*; 12:15 p.m., FloHoops		vs. UTEP; West Palm Beach Classic	W 81–71	6–5	Massimino Court (N/A); West Palm Beach, FL
December 31, 2023; 11:00 a.m., BTN		at No. 16 Indiana	L 71–77	6–6 (0–2)	Simon Skjodt Assembly Hall (11,600); Bloomington, IN
January 7, 2024; 2:00 p.m., B1G+		Wisconsin	L 61–67	6–7 (0–3)	State Farm Center (3,691); Champaign, IL
January 11, 2024; 7:00 p.m., BTN		at Nebraska	L 48–56	6–8 (0–4)	Pinnacle Bank Arena (4,040); Lincoln, NE
January 14, 2024; 2:00 p.m., B1G+		at Northwestern	W 93–52	7–8 (1–4)	Welsh–Ryan Arena (2,322); Evanston, IL
January 17, 2024; 6:00 p.m., B1G+		Rutgers	W 96–68	8–8 (2–4)	State Farm Center (2,845); Champaign, IL
January 20, 2024; 12:00 p.m., B1G+		at Maryland	L 82–90	8–9 (2–5)	Xfinity Center (6,409); College Park, MD
January 25, 2024; 6:00 p.m., Peacock		No. 12 Ohio State	L 59–67	8–10 (2–6)	State Farm Center (3,254); Champaign, IL
January 28, 2024; 2:00 p.m., B1G+		Minnesota	W 73–68	9–10 (3–6)	State Farm Center (4,788); Champaign, IL
January 31, 2024; 6:00 p.m., B1G+		at Michigan	W 77–64	10–10 (4–6)	Crisler Center (2,522); Ann Arbor, MI
February 5, 2024; 7:00 p.m., BTN		at Purdue	L 72–77 ^{OT}	10–11 (4–7)	Mackey Arena (3,953); West Lafayette, IN
February 8, 2024; 6:00 p.m., B1G+		Northwestern	W 82–71	11–11 (5–7)	State Farm Center (3,002); Champaign, IL
February 11, 2024; 2:00 p.m., FS1		Maryland	L 53–69	11–12 (5–8)	State Farm Center (3,185); Champaign, IL
February 15, 2024; 5:00 p.m., B1G+		at Penn State	W 86–71	12–12 (6–8)	Bryce Jordan Center (2,376); University Park, PA
February 19, 2024; 1:00 p.m., FOX		No. 14 Indiana	W 86–66	13–12 (7–8)	State Farm Center (3,878); Champaign, IL
February 25, 2024; 12:00 p.m., FS1		at No. 4 Iowa	L 85–101	13–13 (7–9)	Carver–Hawkeye Arena (14,998); Iowa City, IA
February 29, 2024; 7:00 p.m., BTN		at Michigan State	L 70–87	13–14 (7–10)	Breslin Center (3,392); East Lansing, MI
March 3, 2024; 3:00 p.m., BTN		Nebraska	W 74–73	14–14 (8–10)	State Farm Center (4,311); Champaign, IL
Big Ten Women's Tournament
March 7, 2024; 11:30 a.m., BTN	(9)	vs. (8) Maryland; Second Round	L 65–75	14–15	Target Center (18,392); Minneapolis, MN
WBIT
March 21, 2024*; 6:00 p.m., ESPN+	(4)	Missouri State; First Round	W 74–69	15–15	State Farm Center (1,391); Champaign, IL
March 24, 2024*; 2:00 p.m., ESPN+	(4)	Stony Brook; Second Round	W 79–62	16–15	State Farm Center (1,527); Champaign, IL
March 28, 2024*; 6:30 p.m., ESPN+	(4)	at (3) Tulsa; Quarterfinals	W 69–61	17–15	Reynolds Center (3,054); Tulsa, OK
April 1, 2024*; 4:00 p.m., ESPNU	(4)	vs. (1) Washington State; Semifinals	W 81–58	18–15	Hinkle Fieldhouse (1,748); Indianapolis, IN
April 3, 2024*; 6:00 p.m., ESPN2	(4)	vs. (1) Villanova; Finals	W 71–57	19–15	Hinkle Fieldhouse (N/A); Indianapolis, IN
*Non-conference game. ^{#}Rankings from AP Poll. (#) Tournament seedings in parentheses. All times are in Central.

== Rankings ==
Ranking movements Legend: ██ Increase in ranking ██ Decrease in ranking — = Not ranked RV = Received votes
	Week																				
Poll	Pre	1	2	3	4	5	6	7	8	9	10	11	12	13	14	15	16	17	18	19	Final
AP	23	RV	—	—	—	—	—	—	—	—	—	—	—	—	—	—	—	—	—	—	Not released
Coaches	RV	—	—	—	—	—	—	—	—	—	—	—	—	—	—	—	—	—	—	—	

== See also ==
- 2023–24 Illinois Fighting Illini men's basketball team
