= Alexis Markowski =

American basketball player

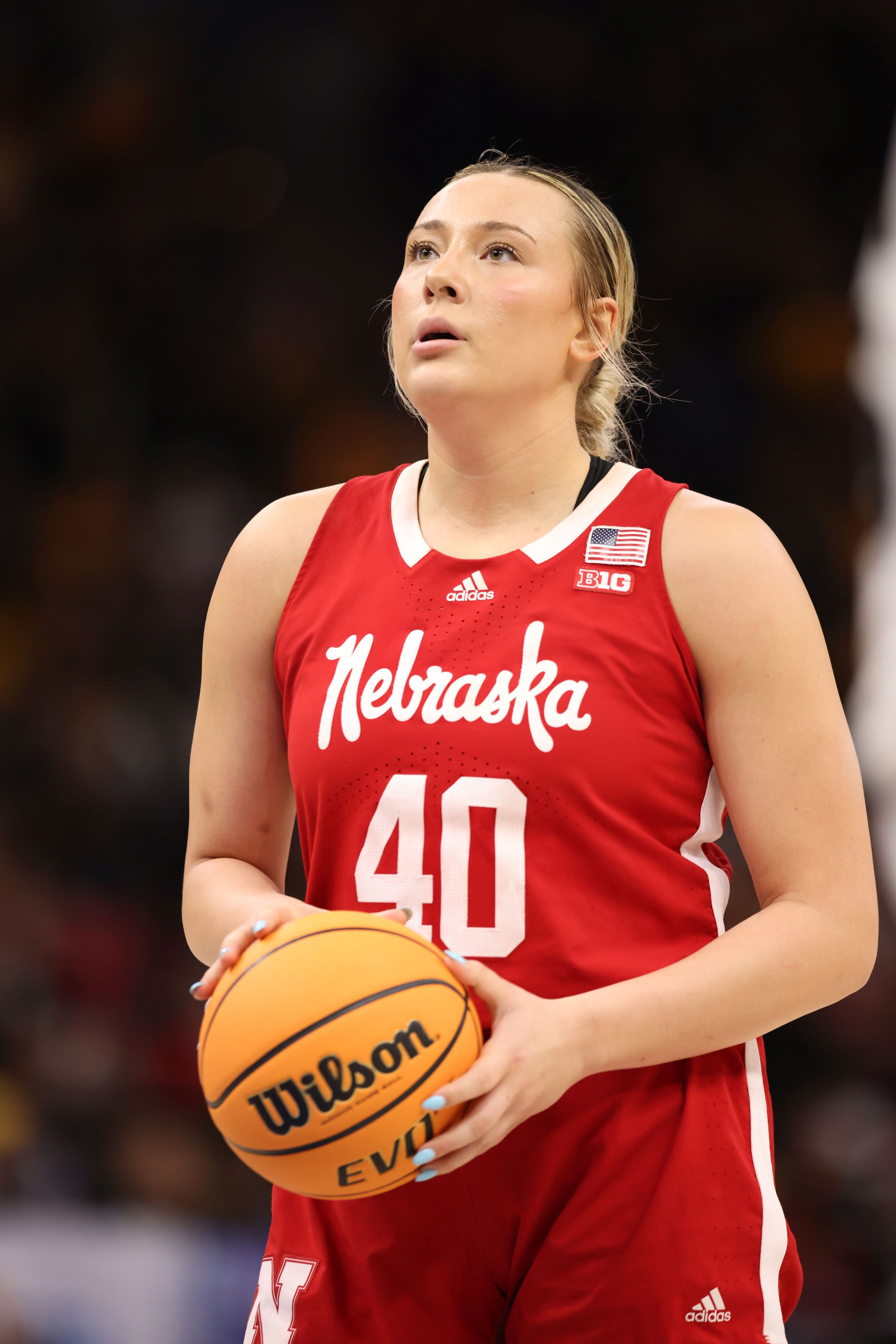
- Markowski with Nebraska in 2022

Personal information
- Born: July 13, 2003 (age 22) Toledo, Ohio, U.S.
- Listed height: 6 ft 3 in (1.91 m)

Career information
- High school: Lincoln Pius X (Lincoln, Nebraska)
- College: Nebraska (2021–2025)
- WNBA draft: 2025: undrafted
- Position: Center / power forward

Career highlights
- Nebraska record-holder for career double-doubles (53); 2x First-team All-Big Ten (2024, 2025); Big Ten Freshman of the Year (2022); Big Ten All-Freshman Team (2022)

Alexis Markowski (born July 13, 2003) is an American former college basketball player for the Nebraska Cornhuskers of the Big Ten Conference.

== Early life and high school career ==
Markowski played high school basketball for Lincoln Pius X High School in Lincoln, Nebraska. Markowski was named the Nebraska Gatorade and MaxPreps State High School Player of the Year in 2021, after averaging 23.3 points, 13 rebounds, and two blocks per game while guiding Lincoln Pius X to its second consecutive Class A state championship. As the top rebounder in the state, she recorded 16 double-doubles and grabbed 20 or more rebounds in four games.
Markowski's father Andy was a forward for the Nebraska Cornhuskers men's basketball team from 1994-95 to 1998-99. As a Husker he served as team captain twice (in 1998 and 1999) and played on four Nebraska postseason teams, contributing to the Huskers' appearance in the 1998 NCAA Tournament and their victory in the 1996 NIT championship.
Markowski initially committed to play college basketball for South Dakota State Jackrabbits but on August 17, 2020 she announced she would commit to Nebraska Cornhuskers.

== College career ==
Markowski was named Big Ten Freshman of the Year and was the only unanimous pick for the Big Ten All-Freshman Team by the league's coaches. Additionally, she earned second-team All-Big Ten honors after claiming eight Big Ten Freshman-of-the-Week awards. As a sophomore, Markowski captured second-team All-Big Ten honors for the second straight season while being the only Big Ten player to average a double-double (12.4 ppg, 10.2 rpg) during the regular season. In her Junior season, Markowski captured first-team All-Big Ten honors. She also earned a spot on the Big Ten All-Tournament Team after leading Nebraska to the Big Ten Championship Game. As a senior, Markowski earned first-team All-Big Ten recognition from the conference media and second-team All-Big Ten honors from coaches. She ended her career as the first Husker women's basketball player to win four first- or second-team all-conference honors. Markowski was a three-time nominee for the Lisa Leslie Award, being named a finalist in her senior season.

== Career statistics ==
Legend
GP	Games played	GS	Games started	MPG	Minutes per game	RPG	Rebounds per game
APG	Assists per game	SPG	Steals per game	BPG	Blocks per game	PPG	Points per game
TO	Turnovers per game	FG%	Field-goal percentage	3P%	3-point field-goal percentage	FT%	Free-throw percentage
**Bold**	Career best	°	League leader

=== College ===
Year	Team	GP	GS	MPG	FG%	3P%	FT%	RPG	APG	SPG	BPG	TO	PPG
2021–22	Nebraska	33	20	21.6	**49.2**	**50.0**	65.9	8.0	0.5	0.8	0.5	1.5	12.8
2022–23	Nebraska	33	32	27.3	43.3	32.9	61.1	9.8	1.1	**0.9**	**0.9**	**2.2**	11.9
2023–24	Nebraska	**35**	**35**	**28.9**	46.7	29.6	**71.1**	**10.5**	1.3	0.7	0.3	1.9	15.7
2024–25	Nebraska	33	33	26.5	47.6	31.5	67.5	8.0	**1.5**	0.5	0.9	1.7	**16.3**
**Career**		134	120	26.1	46.7	34.3	66.5	9.1	1.1	0.7	0.7	1.8	14.2
Statistics retrieved from Sports-Reference.
