= Makira Cook =

American basketball player (born 2001)

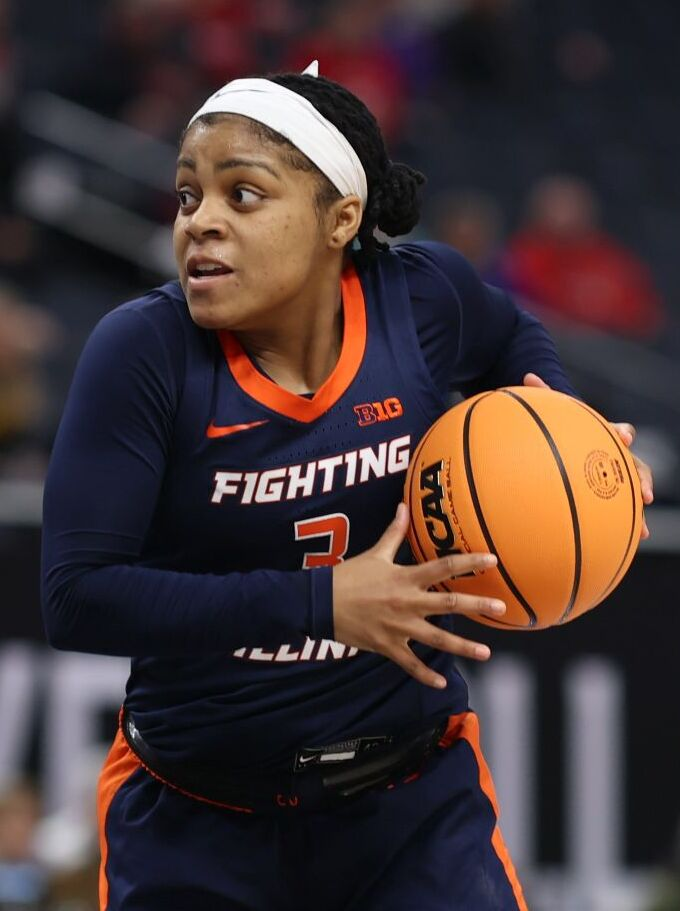
- Cook in 2024

No. 3 – Illinois Fighting Illini
- Position: Guard
- League: Big Ten Conference

Personal information
- Born: November 30, 2001 (age 24) Cincinnati, Ohio, U.S.
- Listed height: 5 ft 6 in (1.68 m)

Career information
- High school: Mount Notre Dame (Reading, Ohio)
- College: Dayton (2020–2022); Illinois (2022–2024)

Career highlights
- WBIT tournament Most Outstanding Player (2024); First-team All-Big Ten (2023); Second-team All-Big Ten (2024); Atlantic 10 Most Improved Player (2022); Second-team All-Atlantic 10 (2022)

Makira Cook (born November 30, 2001) is an American college basketball player for the Illinois Fighting Illini of the Big Ten Conference. She previously played college basketball for the Dayton Flyers.

In 2024, Cook was named as the inaugural WBIT tournament's Most Outstanding Player.

== Early life ==
She is the daughter of Glynett Cunningham and William Cook. As a young child, Cook's first organized sport was cheerleading, which she hated because she wanted to play basketball with the boys. She also participated in soccer, volleyball and softball. Having to choose between softball and basketball, she chose the latter.

Cook played high school basketball for Mount Notre Dame High School in Cincinnati, Ohio where she was named First Team twice and Second Team twice. Cook led the team to two state championships and three conference championships. At the end of her high school career, Cook was considered a four-star recruit, ranked 95th in her class by ESPN. She was also a four-year varsity letter winner. Cook committed to play college basketball for Dayton in 2019.

== College career ==
=== Dayton ===
In her sophomore season, Cook was named the A-10 Most Improved Player. She was also named in the Second Team All-Conference. Cook also earned All-Tournament team honors at A-10 Championships and named to 2021–22 A-10 Commissioner's Honor Roll.

=== Illinois ===
Before the start of her junior season, Cook transferred to the Illinois Fighting Illini. In her junior season, Cook was named unanimous first team All-Big Ten by coaches and first team All-Big Ten by media. She was the first Illini to earn first team honors by both the Big Ten coaches and media since Jenna Smith did so in 2010. She was also an honorable mention All-American honoree by both the WBCA and the Associated Press. Cook was second team All-Big Ten (coaches and media) in her senior season.

In March 2024, it was announced that Cook would return for her fifth season in college basketball.

In April 2024, Cook was named as the inaugural WBIT tournament's Most Outstanding Player. Cook's honor made her the first Illinois women's basketball player in program history to be named MVP in a postseason competition.

As of November 2024, Cook had completed her bachelor's degree in community health and was working on a master's degree in business administration, with a goal of eventually owning a business that specializes in mentorship programs for youth.

On January 8, 2025, the university announced that Cook, a fifth-year senior, would miss the remainder of the 2024–25 season due to an undisclosed "ongoing medical condition", effectively ending her collegiate basketball career. She finished with 1,723 points overall, scoring 1,152 with the Illini. Her final game was December 8, 2024 at Ohio State University.

== Career statistics ==
Legend
GP	Games played	GS	Games started	MPG	Minutes per game	RPG	Rebounds per game
APG	Assists per game	SPG	Steals per game	BPG	Blocks per game	PPG	Points per game
TO	Turnovers per game	FG%	Field-goal percentage	3P%	3-point field-goal percentage	FT%	Free-throw percentage
**Bold**	Career best	°	League leader

=== College ===
Year	Team	GP	GS	MPG	FG%	3P%	FT%	RPG	APG	SPG	BPG	TO	PPG
2020–21	Dayton	18	1	17.5	38.1	26.5	59.1	2.4	1.6	0.4	0.1	0.9	6.2
2021–22	Dayton	31	25	31.2	40.4	**38.0**	76.1	**3.8**	2.9	**1.2**	0.1	1.8	14.8
2022–23	Illinois	30	30	33.9	**41.4**	34.2	**86.6**	3.4	4.2	**1.2**	0.1	2.4	**18.3**
2023–24	Illinois	**31**	**31**	**34.7**	40.5	34.9	81.5	3.1	**4.4**	1.0	**0.2**	**2.8**	16.4
2024–25	Illinois	8	8	28.6	34.8	27.6	80.6	1.9	3.6	1.0	0.1	2.1	14.6
**Career**		118	95	30.5	40.1	34.4	81.4	3.2	3.5	1.0	0.1	2.1	14.6
Statistics retrieved from Sports-Reference.
