= 2023–24 Maryland Terrapins women's basketball team =

American college basketball season

2023–24 Maryland Terrapins women's basketball
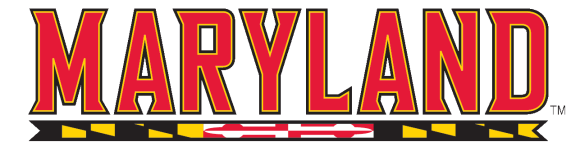

NCAA tournament, First round
- Conference: Big Ten Conference
- Record: 19–14 (9–9 Big Ten)
- Head coach: Brenda Frese (22nd season)
- Assistant coaches: Karen Blair (6th season); Kaitlynn Fratz (6th season); Lindsey Spann (4th season)
- Home arena: Xfinity Center

2023–24 Big Ten women's basketball standings
	Conf.				Overall
Team	W		L	PCT	W		L	PCT
No. 16 Ohio State	16	–	2	.889	26	–	6	.813
No. 2 Iowa †	15	–	3	.833	34	–	5	.872
No. 12 Indiana	15	–	3	.833	26	–	6	.813
Michigan State	12	–	6	.667	22	–	9	.710
Nebraska	11	–	7	.611	23	–	12	.657
Michigan	9	–	9	.500	20	–	14	.588
Penn State	9	–	9	.500	22	–	13	.629
Maryland	9	–	9	.500	19	–	14	.576
Illinois	8	–	10	.444	19	–	15	.559
Wisconsin	6	–	12	.333	15	–	17	.469
Minnesota	5	–	13	.278	20	–	16	.556
Purdue	5	–	13	.278	15	–	19	.441
Northwestern	4	–	14	.222	9	–	21	.300
Rutgers	2	–	16	.111	8	–	24	.250
† 2024 Big Ten tournament winner Rankings from AP Poll

The 2023–24 Maryland Terrapins women's basketball team represented the University of Maryland, College Park during the 2023–24 NCAA Division I women's basketball season. The Terrapins were led by head coach Brenda Frese in her 22nd season, and played their home games at the Xfinity Center as a member of the Big Ten Conference.

== Previous season ==
The Terrapins finished the 2022–23 season with a 28–7 record, including 15–3 in Big Ten play to finish in third place. They received an at-large bid to the 2023 NCAA Division I women's basketball tournament, where they advanced to the Elite Eight, before being eliminated by South Carolina.

== Offseason ==
=== Departures ===
Maryland departures
Name	Number	Pos.	Height	Year	Hometown	Reason for departure
Abby Meyers	10	G	6' 0"	Senior	Potomac, MD	Graduated/2023 WNBA draft; selected 11th overall by Dallas Wings
Diamond Miller	1	G	6' 3"	Senior	Somerset, NJ	Graduated/2023 WNBA draft; selected 2nd overall by Minnesota Lynx
Elisa Pinzan	5	G	5' 8"	Graduate student	Murano, Italy	Graduated
Mila Reynolds	15	G/F	6' 3"	Freshman	South Bend, IN	Transferred to Purdue
Ava Sciolla	2	G	6' 0"	Freshman	Fairless Hills, PA	Transferred to Columbia

=== Incoming transfers ===
Maryland transfers
Name	Pos.	Height	Year	Hometown	Previous school
Jakia Brown-Turner	11	G	6' 0"	Graduate student	NC State

== Roster ==
2023–24 Maryland Terrapins women's basketball team
Players
Coaches

Pos.	#	Name	Height	Year	Previous school	Hometown
G	0	Shyanne Sellers	6 ft 2 in (1.88 m)	Jr	Aurora	Aurora, OH
G	2	Riley Nelson	6 ft 2 in (1.88 m)	Fr	Bullis School	Clarksburg, MD
G	3	Lavender Briggs	6 ft 1 in (1.85 m)	GS	Provo; Florida	Provo, UT
F	5	Brinae Alexander	6 ft 0 in (1.83 m)	GS	Riverdale; Vanderbilt	Murfreesboro, TN
G	11	Jakia Brown-Turner	6 ft 0 in (1.83 m)	GS	Bishop McNamara	Oxon Hill, MD
F	13	Faith Masonius	6 ft 1 in (1.85 m)	GS	Manasquan	Spring Lake, NJ
F	14	Allie Kubek	6 ft 2 in (1.88 m)	RS Jr	Sanford School; Towson	Elkton, MD
G	15	Zen Nuako	5 ft 6 in (1.68 m)	Fr	Plano	Bowie, MD
C	20	Hawa Doumbouya	6 ft 7 in (2.01 m)	Fr	Our Lady of Mount Carmel	Bronx, NY
F	21	Emma Chardon	6 ft 2 in (1.88 m)	RS So	CEC André-Chavanne	Geneva, Switzerland
G	24	Bri McDaniel	5 ft 10 in (1.78 m)	So	Kenwood Academy	Chicago, IL
G	30	Mary Sareen	5 ft 8 in (1.73 m)	Fr	Radnor	Wayne, PA
G	33	Summer Bostock	6 ft 1 in (1.85 m)	Fr	King's Christian Collegiate	Toronto, ON
G	34	Emily Fisher	6 ft 0 in (1.83 m)	Fr	Libertyville	Libertyville, IL

Head coach

- Brenda Frese (Arizona)

Assistant coach(es)

- Karen Blair (SMU)
- Kaitlynn Fratz (California (PA))
- Lindsey Spann (Penn State)

Legend

- (C) Team captain
- (S) Suspended
- (I) Ineligible
- (W) Walk-on
- Injured
- Current redshirt

Roster

== Schedule and results ==
Date time, TV	Rank^{#}	Opponent^{#}	Result	Record	Site (attendance) city, state
Exhibition
October 22, 2023*; 3:30 p.m., B1G+	No. 14	California (PA)	W 103–37	—	Xfinity Center; College Park, MD
October 29, 2023*; 12:00 p.m., B1G+	No. 14	East Carolina	W 76–66	—	Xfinity Center; College Park, MD
Regular Season
November 6, 2023*; 7:00 p.m., B1G+	No. 14	Harvard	W 98–75	1–0	Xfinity Center (4,891); College Park, MD
November 12, 2023*; 1:00 p.m., ABC	No. 14	at No. 6 South Carolina	L 76–114	1–1	Colonial Life Arena (16,007); Columbia, SC
November 16, 2023*; 6:30 p.m., FS1	No. 20	at No. 8 UConn	L 48–80	1–2	Harry A. Gampel Pavilion (10,299); Storrs, CT
November 19, 2023*; 12:00 p.m., BTN	No. 20	Syracuse	W 83–81	2–2	Xfinity Center (7,090); College Park, MD
November 23, 2023*; 11:00 a.m., FloHoops		vs. No. 23 Washington State; Cancún Challenge Mayan Division	L 67–87	2–3	Hard Rock Hotel Riviera Maya (150); Cancún, Mexico
November 24, 2023*; 1:30 p.m., FloHoops		vs. Green Bay; Cancún Challenge Mayan Division	W 68–59	3–3	Hard Rock Hotel Riviera Maya (111); Cancún, Mexico
November 25, 2023*; 11:00 a.m., FloHoops		vs. UMass; Cancún Challenge Mayan Division	W 92–63	4–3	Hard Rock Hotel Riviera Maya (107); Cancún, Mexico
November 29, 2023*; 7:00 p.m., B1G+		Niagara	W 114–44	5–3	Xfinity Center (5,064); College Park, MD
December 3, 2023*; 1:00 p.m., B1G+		George Mason	W 86–77	6–3	Xfinity Center (5,901); College Park, MD
December 10, 2023; 1:00 p.m., B1G+		Northwestern	W 71–58	7–3 (1–0)	Xfinity Center (5,127); College Park, MD
December 12, 2023*; 11:00 a.m., B1G+		Towson	W 99–51	8–3	Xfinity Center (14,994); College Park, MD
December 20, 2023*; 2:00 p.m., B1G+		James Madison	W 78–55	9–3	Xfinity Center (5,032); College Park, MD
December 31, 2023; 2:00 p.m., BTN		at Nebraska	L 81–87	9–4 (1–1)	Pinnacle Bank Arena (8,795); Lincoln, NE
January 3, 2024; 8:00 p.m., B1G+		at Minnesota	W 72–64	10–4 (2–1)	Williams Arena (2,362); Minneapolis, MN
January 9, 2024; 6:00 p.m., BTN		at Michigan State	L 69–74	10–5 (2–2)	Breslin Student Events Center (2,886); East Lansing, MI
January 14, 2024; 12:00 p.m., BTN+		Purdue; Rescheduled from January 6	W 88–66	11–5 (3–2)	Xfinity Center (7,231); College Park, MD
January 17, 2024; 7:00 p.m., Peacock		No. 18 Ohio State	L 76–84	11–6 (3–3)	Xfinity Center (5,112); College Park, MD
January 20, 2024; 1:00 p.m., B1G+		Illinois	W 90–82	12–6 (4–3)	Xfinity Center (6,409); College Park, MD
January 24, 2024; 7:00 p.m., B1G+		at Michigan	L 77–79 ^{OT}	12–7 (4–4)	Crisler Center (2,586); Ann Arbor, MI
January 28, 2024; 1:00 p.m., B1G+		at Penn State	L 76–112	12–8 (4–5)	Bryce Jordan Center (3,532); University Park, PA
January 31, 2024; 7:00 p.m., Peacock		No. 10 Indiana	L 73–87	12–9 (4–6)	Xfinity Center (7,137); College Park, MD
February 3, 2024; 8:00 p.m., FOX		No. 3 Iowa	L 85–93	12–10 (4–7)	Xfinity Center (17,950); College Park, MD
February 6, 2024; 8:30 p.m., BTN		at Rutgers	W 67–59	13–10 (5–7)	Jersey Mike's Arena (1,328); Piscataway, NJ
February 11, 2024; 3:00 p.m., FS1		at Illinois	W 69–53	14–10 (6–7)	State Farm Center (3,185); Champaign, IL
February 18, 2024; 1:00 p.m., B1G+		Penn State	W 77–62	15–10 (7–7)	Xfinity Center (9,443); College Park, MD
February 21, 2024; 7:00 p.m., B1G+		Rutgers	W 81–62	16–10 (8–7)	Xfinity Center (5,192); College Park, MD
February 25, 2024; 2:00 p.m., BTN		at No. 2 Ohio State	L 66–79	16–11 (8–8)	Value City Arena (10,790); Columbus, OH
February 29, 2024; 6:00 p.m., BTN		Wisconsin	W 79–63	17–11 (9–8)	Xfinity Center (6,608); College Park, MD
March 3, 2024; 3:00 p.m., Peacock		at No. 14 Indiana	L 54–71	17–12 (9–9)	Simon Skjodt Assembly Hall (12,402); Bloomington, IN
Big Ten tournament
March 7, 2024; 12:30 p.m., BTN	(8)	vs. (9) Illinois; Second round	W 75–65	18–12	Target Center (18,392); Minneapolis, MN
March 8, 2024; 12:30 p.m., BTN	(8)	vs. (1) No. 4 Ohio State; Quarterfinals	W 82–61	19–12	Target Center (18,481); Minneapolis, MN
March 9, 2024; 2:00 p.m., BTN	(8)	vs. (5) Nebraska; Semifinals	L 68–78	19–13	Target Center; Minneapolis, MN
NCAA tournament
March 22, 2024*; 7:30 p.m., ESPN2	(10 P4)	vs. (7 P4) Iowa State; First round	L 86–93	19–14	Maples Pavilion; Stanford, CA
*Non-conference game. ^{#}Rankings from AP Poll. (#) Tournament seedings in parentheses. P4=Portland 4. All times are in Eastern Time. Source:

== Rankings ==
Ranking movements Legend: ██ Increase in ranking ██ Decrease in ranking — = Not ranked RV = Received votes
	Week																				
Poll	Pre	1	2	3	4	5	6	7	8	9	10	11	12	13	14	15	16	17	18	19	Final
AP	14	20	RV	RV	—	—	—	—	—	RV	—	—	—	—	—	—	—	—	—	—	Not released
Coaches	11	19	24	RV	RV	RV	RV	RV	—	RV	RV	—	—	—	—	—	—	—	—	—	
