= Pius X High School (Nebraska) =

Private school in Lincoln, Nebraska, United States

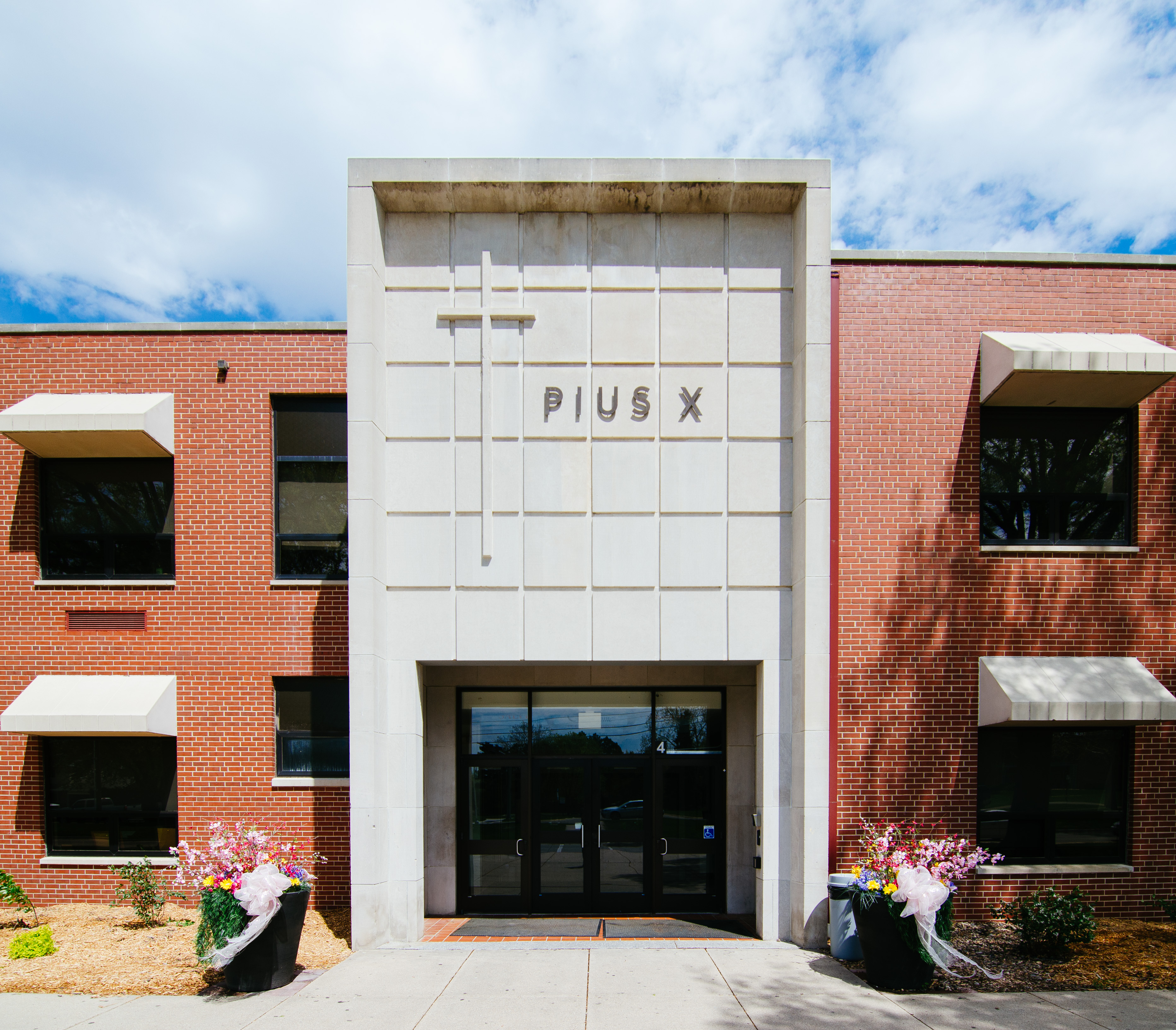

Location
- 6000 A Street; Lincoln, Nebraska 68510; United States
- Coordinates: 40°47′58″N 96°38′20″W

Information
- Type: Private, coeducational
- Motto: "Restore All Things In Christ"
- Religious affiliation: Roman Catholic
- Established: 1956
- Teaching staff: 74.5 (FTE)
- Grades: 9–12
- Student to teacher ratio: 16.8
- Colors: Green, gold and white
- Athletics conference: Heartland Athletic Conference (HAC)
- Team name: Thunderbolts
- Accreditation: North Central Association of Colleges and Schools
- Website: http://www.piusx.net

Lincoln Pius X High School is a Catholic high school in Lincoln, Nebraska, and the Diocese of Lincoln. The school was founded October 1, 1956 by Bishop Louis B. Kucera.

== History ==
Pius X High School was founded in 1956.

== Academics ==
Pius X has won state championships in academic decathlon.

== Athletics ==
Because of rising enrollment, Pius X moved from Class B to Class A for the 2016-17 school year.

State championships
Season	Sport	Number of championships	Year
Fall	Football	6	1973, 1975, 1978, 1995, 1997, 1998, 2004
Fall	Cross country, boys	10	1976, 1978, 1979, 1981, 1982, 1983, 1985, 1989, 1991, 2007
Fall	Cross country, girls	11	1986, 1987, 1990, 1991, 2004, 2005, 2007, 2011, 2013, 2014, 2018
Fall	Volleyball	7	1996, 1997, 1998, 2006, 2007, 2008, 2011
Fall	Softball	2	2002, 2012
Fall	Golf, girls	3	2001 (A), 2002 (A), 2003 (A)
Fall	Tennis, boys	14	1978, 1980, 1981, 1983, 1993, 1997, 2000, 2001, 2008, 2009, 2013, 2016, 2018, 2019
Winter	Basketball, boys	7	1923 (as Cathedral High School), 1924 (as Cathedral High School), 1974, 1992, 2000, 2004, 2019
Winter	Basketball, girls	5	1991, 1992, 2015, 2020, 2021
Winter	Swimming, boys		
Winter	Swimming, girls		
Winter	Wrestling, boys		
Winter	Bowling, boys		
Winter	Bowling, girls		
Spring	Soccer, boys	2	2006, 2010
Spring	Soccer, girls	2	2004, 2005
Spring	Track and field, boys	1	1984
Spring	Track and field, girls	1	1982
Spring	Golf, boys	3	1957, 1959, 1982
Spring	Baseball	3	2012, 2014, 2015
Spring	Tennis, girls	8	1988, 1991, 1995, 1996, 1997, 1998, 2004, 2021
Total		85	

In addition to the NSAA championships, Pius X bowling has also won state championships in both boys' and girls' bowling.

== Performing arts ==
Pius X has two competitive show choirs, the mixed-gender "Spectrum" and the all-female "Prism".

== Notable alumni ==
- Joe Glenn, football player and coach
- Michael Helman, Major League Baseball player
- Alexis Markowski, basketball player
- Tyler Polak, soccer player
- Brandon Teena, transgender man whose 1993 murder was memorialized in the film Boys Don't Cry; attended Pius X but was expelled in his senior year
- Adam Treu, football player
- Greg Zuerlein, football player
