= Sydney Affolter =

American basketball player

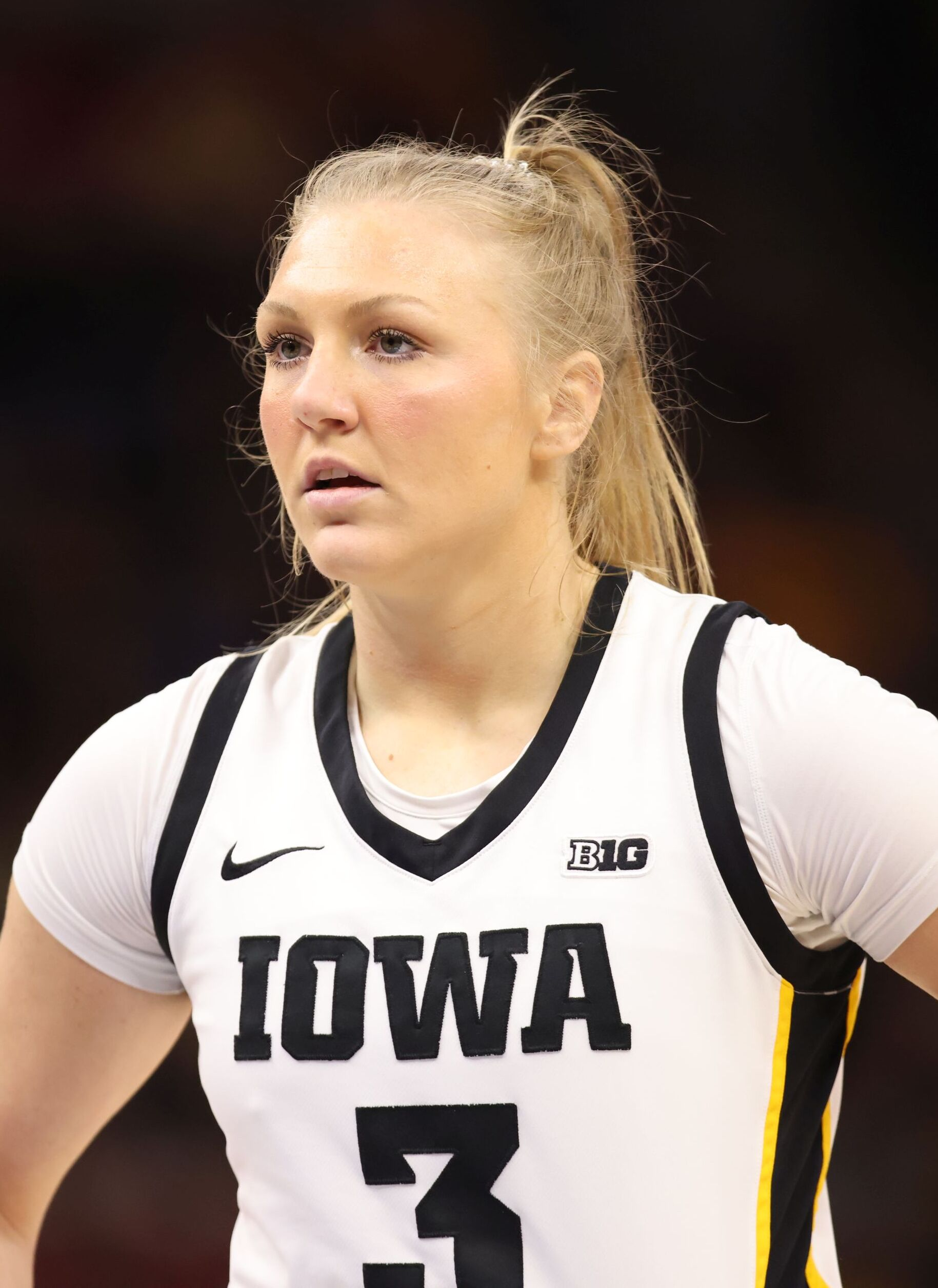
- Affolter with Iowa in 2024

Personal information
- Born: April 13, 2003 (age 23) Chicago, Illinois, U.S.
- Listed height: 5 ft 11 in (1.80 m)

Career information
- High school: Marist (Chicago, Illinois)
- College: Iowa (2021–2025)
- WNBA draft: 2025: undrafted
- Position: Guard

Sydney Affolter (born April 13, 2003) is an American basketball player. She played college basketball for the Iowa Hawkeyes.

== Early life and high school career ==
Affolter is one of two children born to Shellie and Ed Affolter. Her father played college basketball for the University of Illinois Chicago, and her brother, Trey, played for St. Ambrose. She went undefeated in five seasons of grammar school basketball at St. Christina School in Chicago. She played high school basketball for Marist High School in Chicago, winning two regional titles, and was named all-state three times. She committed to Iowa as a junior in January 2020. She went undefeated in 48 games with Amateur Athletic Union (AAU) team All Iowa Attack in the summer of 2020.

== College career ==
Affolter began playing for Iowa in 2021–22. She played off the bench as Iowa reached the title game in the 2023 NCAA tournament. She joined the team's starting lineup in the 2024 postseason after an injury to guard Molly Davis. She recorded 11 points and 11 rebounds in Iowa's victory in the 2024 Big Ten title game and was recognized with all-tournament honors. In the 2024 NCAA Regional Final, she had 16 points and five rebounds, helping to lead the Hawkeyes to the Final Four and earning a spot on the All-Regional Team. Affolter came to Iowa in 2021 as a guard amd became a key part of the teams depth. She stood out for her hustle on defense and the glass, helping Iowa get back-to-back final four appearances in 2023 and 2024. When she stepped I to the starting spot in 23-24 Big 10 tournament, she posted double digit scores and earned a spot on the all tournament team.

== Career statistics ==
Legend
GP	Games played	GS	Games started	MPG	Minutes per game	RPG	Rebounds per game
APG	Assists per game	SPG	Steals per game	BPG	Blocks per game	PPG	Points per game
TO	Turnovers per game	FG%	Field-goal percentage	3P%	3-point field-goal percentage	FT%	Free-throw percentage
**Bold**	Career best	°	League leader

=== College ===
Year	Team	GP	GS	MPG	FG%	3P%	FT%	RPG	APG	SPG	BPG	TO	PPG
2021–22	Iowa	19	0	9.4	23.7	16.7	**91.7**	2.5	0.4	0.3	0.1	0.6	1.6
2022–23	Iowa	37	0	10.3	47.9	20.8	86.1	2.3	1.0	0.4	0.1	**0.5**	2.9
2023–24	Iowa	**39**	12	24.8	**55.2**	41.4	83.0	6.4	2.3	1.1	**0.4**	1.0	8.4
2024–25	Iowa	33	**32**	**29.5**	47.7	**46.3**	75.3	**7.8**	**2.7**	**1.3**	0.2	**1.9**	**8.5**
**Career**		128	44	19.5	48.8	39.2	81.5	5.0	1.7	0.8	0.2	1.0	5.8
Statistics retrieved from Sports-Reference.
