= 2023–24 Rutgers Scarlet Knights women's basketball team =

American college basketball season

2023–24 Rutgers Scarlet Knights women's basketball
- Conference: Big Ten Conference
- Record: 8–24 (2–16 Big Ten)
- Head coach: Coquese Washington (2nd season)
- Assistant coaches: Tasha Pointer; John Hampton; Nneka Enemkpali; Jeanine Wasielewski
- Home arena: Jersey Mike's Arena

2023–24 Big Ten women's basketball standings
	Conf.				Overall
Team	W		L	PCT	W		L	PCT
No. 16 Ohio State	16	–	2	.889	26	–	6	.813
No. 2 Iowa †	15	–	3	.833	34	–	5	.872
No. 12 Indiana	15	–	3	.833	26	–	6	.813
Michigan State	12	–	6	.667	22	–	9	.710
Nebraska	11	–	7	.611	23	–	12	.657
Michigan	9	–	9	.500	20	–	14	.588
Penn State	9	–	9	.500	22	–	13	.629
Maryland	9	–	9	.500	19	–	14	.576
Illinois	8	–	10	.444	19	–	15	.559
Wisconsin	6	–	12	.333	15	–	17	.469
Minnesota	5	–	13	.278	20	–	16	.556
Purdue	5	–	13	.278	15	–	19	.441
Northwestern	4	–	14	.222	9	–	21	.300
Rutgers	2	–	16	.111	8	–	24	.250
† 2024 Big Ten tournament winner Rankings from AP Poll

The 2023–24 Rutgers Scarlet Knights women's basketball team represented Rutgers University during the 2023–24 college basketball season. The Scarlet Knights were led by second-year head coach Coquese Washington, and played their games at the Jersey Mike's Arena in Piscataway, New Jersey as members of the Big Ten Conference.

== Previous season ==
The Scarlet Knights finished the 2022–23 season 12–20, 5–13 in Big Ten play, to finish in 11th place. They defeated Northwestern in the first round of the Big Ten tournament, before losing to Illinois in the second round.

== Roster ==
2023–24 Rutgers Scarlet Knights women's basketball team
Players
Coaches

Pos.	#	Name	Height	Year	Previous school	Hometown
G	0	Jillian Huerter	6 ft 0 in (1.83 m)	Fr	Shenendehowa High School	Clifton Park, NY
G/F	1	Destiny Adams	6 ft 3 in (1.91 m)	Jr	North Carolina	Manchester, NJ
G	2	Kaylene Smikle	6 ft 0 in (1.83 m)	So	Westtown School	Farmingdale, NY
G	3	Mya Petticord	5 ft 9 in (1.75 m)	So	Texas A&M	Detroit, MI
G/F	4	Antonia Bates	6 ft 3 in (1.91 m)	So	Rutgers Prep	Easton, PA
G	11	Awa Sidibe	5 ft 11 in (1.8 m)	GS	Salt Lake Community College	Bamako, Mali
G	20	Erica Lafayette	6 ft 0 in (1.83 m)	Sr	McKinley High School	Baton Rouge, LA
C	22	Kassondra Brown	6 ft 2 in (1.88 m)	GS	Saint Peter's	Abington, PA
G	24	Lisa Thompson	5 ft 9 in (1.75 m)	Fr	Example Academy	Joliet, IL
G	33	Kennedy Brandt	5 ft 10 in (1.78 m)	Fr	Glenbard West High School	Glen Ellyn, IL
C	54	Chyna Cornwell	6 ft 3 in (1.91 m)	Sr	Newton-Conover High School	Conover, NC

Head coach

- Coquese Washington (Notre Dame)

Assistant coach(es)

- Tasha Pointer (Rutgers)
- John Hampton (Mansfield)
- Nneka Enemkpali (Texas)
- Jeanine Wasielewski (Northwestern)

Legend

- (C) Team captain
- (S) Suspended
- (I) Ineligible
- (W) Walk-on
- Injured
- Current redshirt

Roster
Last update: January 13, 2024

== Schedule and results ==
Date time, TV	Rank^{#}	Opponent^{#}	Result	Record	Site (attendance) city, state
Regular season
November 6, 2023*; 7:00 p.m.		Monmouth	W 56–51	1–0	Jersey Mike's Arena (1,403); Piscataway, NJ
November 9, 2023*; 7:00 p.m.		Wagner	W 86–43	2–0	Jersey Mike's Arena (1,688); Piscataway, NJ
November 12, 2023*; 5:00 p.m.		Auburn	L 56–76	2–1	Jersey Mike's Arena (1,619); Piscataway, NJ
November 15, 2023*; 7:00 p.m.		at Seton Hall	L 63–82	2–2	Walsh Gymnasium (822); South Orange, NJ
November 18, 2023*; 12:00 p.m.		Saint Francis (PA)	W 80–51	3–2	Jersey Mike's Arena (1,709); Piscataway, NJ
November 20, 2023*; 7:00 p.m.		Fairfield	L 54–78	3–3	Jersey Mike's Arena (1,309); Piscataway, NJ
November 24, 2023*; 6:30 p.m.		vs. Texas Tech; Las Vegas Thanksgiving Classic	L 72–79	3–4	South Point Arena; Las Vegas, NV
November 25, 2023*; 6:30 p.m.		vs. Boise State; Las Vegas Thanksgiving Classic	L 65–68	3–5	South Point Arena; Las Vegas, NV
November 29, 2023*; 11:00 a.m.		Delaware State	W 82–48	4–5	Jersey Mike's Arena (1,786); Piscataway, NJ
December 1, 2023*; 7:00 p.m.		Lafayette	W 69–48	5–5	Jersey Mike's Arena (1,497); Piscataway, NJ
December 5, 2023*; 7:00 p.m., B1G+		La Salle	W 98–67	6–5	Jersey Mike's Arena (1,216); Piscataway, NJ
December 9, 2023; 4:00 p.m., BTN		No. 16 Indiana	L 56–66	6–6 (0–1)	Jersey Mike's Arena (3,525); Piscataway, NJ
December 13, 2023*; 7:00 p.m., ESPN+		at Princeton; Rivalry	L 55–66	6–7	Jadwin Gymnasium (1,307); Princeton, NJ
December 17, 2023*; 5:30 p.m., FS1		No. 16 Virginia Tech	L 59–84	6–8	Jersey Mike's Arena (4,731); Piscataway, NJ
December 30, 2023; 3:00 p.m.		at Northwestern	L 70–77	6–9 (0–2)	Welsh–Ryan Arena (1,820); Evanston, IL
January 2, 2024; 7:00 p.m.		at Purdue	L 76–77	6–10 (0–3)	Mackey Arena (3,263); West Lafayette, IN
January 5, 2024; 6:00 p.m.		No. 4 Iowa	L 69–103	6–11 (0–4)	Jersey Mike's Arena (8,000); Piscataway, NJ
January 11, 2024; 6:00 p.m.		at No. 17 Ohio State	L 55–90	6–12 (0–5)	Value City Arena (5,227); Columbus, OH
January 14, 2024; 2:00 p.m.		Penn State	L 80–94	6–13 (0–6)	Jersey Mike's Arena (6,938); Piscataway, NJ
January 17, 2024; 8:00 p.m.		at Illinois	L 69–96	6–14 (0–7)	State Farm Center (2,845); Champaign, IL
January 21, 2024; 2:00 p.m.		Michigan	L 50–56	6–15 (0–8)	Jersey Mike's Arena (4,647); Piscataway, NJ
January 27, 2024; 3:00 p.m.		at Wisconsin	L 62–73	6–16 (0–9)	Kohl Center (6,035); Madison, WI
January 30, 2024; 7:00 p.m.		Michigan State	L 64–82	6–17 (0–10)	Jersey Mike's Arena (1,409); Piscataway, NJ
February 3, 2024; 3:00 p.m.		at Nebraska	W 71–70	7–17 (1–10)	Pinnacle Bank Arena (5,831); Lincoln, NE
February 6, 2024; 8:30 p.m., BTN		Maryland	L 59–67	7–18 (1–11)	Jersey Mike's Arena (1,328); Piscataway, NJ
February 10, 2024; 2:00 p.m., BTN		at Michigan	L 58–86	7–19 (1–12)	Crisler Center (4,238); Ann Arbor, MI
February 13, 2024; 7:00 p.m.		Minnesota	W 81–73	8–19 (2–12)	Jersey Mike's Arena (1,511); Piscataway, NJ
February 17, 2024; 2:00 p.m.		Wisconsin	L 43–61	8–20 (2–13)	Jersey Mike's Arena (2,558); Piscataway, NJ
February 21, 2024; 7:00 p.m.		at Maryland	L 62–81	8–21 (2–14)	Xfinity Center (5,192); College Park, MD
February 24, 2024; 2:00 p.m.		at Michigan State	L 57–93	8–22 (2–15)	Breslin Center (7,696); East Lansing, MI
March 3, 2024; 2:00 p.m.		Northwestern	L 61–72	8–23 (2–16)	Jersey Mike's Arena (3,571); Piscataway, NJ
Big Ten women's tournament
March 6, 2024; 9:00 p.m., Peacock	(14)	vs. (11) Minnesota; First round	L 69–77	8–24	Target Center (18,392); Minneapolis, MN
*Non-conference game. ^{#}Rankings from AP poll. (#) Tournament seedings in parentheses. All times are in Eastern.

== See also ==
- 2023–24 Rutgers Scarlet Knights men's basketball team
