= 2023–24 Northwestern Wildcats women's basketball team =

Intercollegiate basketball season team

2023–24 Northwestern Wildcats women's basketball
- Conference: Big Ten Conference
- Record: 9–21 (4–14 Big Ten)
- Head coach: Joe McKeown (16th season)
- Associate head coach: Tangela Smith
- Assistant coaches: Maggie Lyon; Brittany Johnson
- Home arena: Welsh–Ryan Arena

2023–24 Big Ten women's basketball standings
	Conf.				Overall
Team	W		L	PCT	W		L	PCT
No. 16 Ohio State	16	–	2	.889	26	–	6	.813
No. 2 Iowa †	15	–	3	.833	34	–	5	.872
No. 12 Indiana	15	–	3	.833	26	–	6	.813
Michigan State	12	–	6	.667	22	–	9	.710
Nebraska	11	–	7	.611	23	–	12	.657
Michigan	9	–	9	.500	20	–	14	.588
Penn State	9	–	9	.500	22	–	13	.629
Maryland	9	–	9	.500	19	–	14	.576
Illinois	8	–	10	.444	19	–	15	.559
Wisconsin	6	–	12	.333	15	–	17	.469
Minnesota	5	–	13	.278	20	–	16	.556
Purdue	5	–	13	.278	15	–	19	.441
Northwestern	4	–	14	.222	9	–	21	.300
Rutgers	2	–	16	.111	8	–	24	.250
† 2024 Big Ten tournament winner Rankings from AP Poll

The 2023–24 Northwestern Wildcats women's basketball team represented Northwestern University during the 2023–24 NCAA Division I women's basketball season. The Wildcats, were led by sixteenth-year head coach Joe McKeown and played their home games at the Welsh–Ryan Arena as members of the Big Ten Conference.

== Previous season ==
The Wildcats finished the 2022–23 season 9–21, 2–16 in Big Ten play to finish in last (14th) place. As the #14 seed in the Big Ten tournament, they were defeated by #11 seed Rutgers in the first round.

== Roster ==
2023–24 Northwestern Wildcats women's basketball team
Players
Coaches

Pos.	#	Name	Height	Year	Previous school	Hometown
F	0	Rachel Mutombo	6 ft 3 in (1.91 m)	Fr	Good Counsel High School	Silver Spring, Maryland
G	2	Caroline Lau	5 ft 9 in (1.75 m)	So	St. Luke's School	Westport, Connecticut
G	3	Maggie Pina	5 ft 7 in (1.7 m)	GS	Boston University	West Chester, Pennsylvania
F	10	Caileigh Walsh	6 ft 3 in (1.91 m)	Jr	Gill St. Bernard's School	Sparta, New Jersey
G	11	Hailey Weaver	5 ft 11 in (1.8 m)	Jr	Solon High School	Solon, Ohio
G	12	Casey Harter	5 ft 11 in (1.8 m)	Fr	Souderton High School	Harleysville, Pennsylvania
F	13	Mercy Ademusayo	6 ft 4 in (1.93 m)	Jr	Linden Hall	Ode-Irele, Nigeria
F	20	Paige Mott	6 ft 1 in (1.85 m)	Sr	Abington Friends School	Philadelphia, Pennsylvania
G	21	Melannie Daley	5 ft 11 in (1.8 m)	Jr	Hastings High School	Hastings-on-Hudson, New York
F	22	Alana Goodchild	6 ft 2 in (1.88 m)	So	Australian Institute of Sport	Sydney, Australia
G	23	Jasmine McWilliams	5 ft 11 in (1.8 m)	Sr	North Central High School	Indianapolis, Indiana
F	25	Lauren Trumpy	6 ft 5 in (1.96 m)	So	Trinity High School	Camp Hill, Pennsylvania
F	31	Crystal Fuqu Wang	6 ft 2 in (1.88 m)	Fr	Sierra Canyon School	Beijing, China

Head coach

- Joe McKeown (Kent State)

Assistant coach(es)

- Tangela Smith (Iowa)
- Maggie Lyon (Northwestern)
- Brittany Johnson (Ohio State)

Legend

- (C) Team captain
- (S) Suspended
- (I) Ineligible
- (W) Walk-on
- Injured
- Current redshirt

Roster
Last update: January 13, 2024

== Schedule and results ==
Date time, TV	Rank^{#}	Opponent^{#}	Result	Record	Site (attendance) city, state
Exhibition
November 2, 2023*; 7:00 p.m., BTN+		Lewis	W 80–54		Welsh–Ryan Arena; Evanston, IL
Regular season
November 9, 2023*; 7:00 p.m., BTN+		UIC	W 92–86 ^{OT}	1–0	Welsh–Ryan Arena (1,623); Evanston, IL
November 12, 2023*; 2:00 p.m., BTN+		Omaha	W 87–69	2–0	Welsh–Ryan Arena (1,566); Evanston, IL
November 15, 2023*; 6:00 p.m., ACCN		at No. 16 Notre Dame	L 52–110	2–1	Purcell Pavilion (7,065); Notre Dame, IN
November 19, 2023*; 2:00 p.m., BTN+		Southeast Missouri State	W 76–68	3–1	Welsh–Ryan Arena (1,439); Evanston, IL
November 22, 2023*; 1:00 p.m., FloSports		vs. No. 13 Florida State; Ball Dawgs Classic semifinals	L 52–90	3–2	Dollar Loan Center (1,634); Henderson, NV
November 24, 2023*; 11:00 p.m., FloSports		vs. Belmont; Ball Dawgs Classic 3rd place game	L 61–83	3–3	Dollar Loan Center (1,584); Henderson, NV
November 29, 2023*; 11:00 a.m., BTN+		Loyola Chicago	L 68–73	3–4	Welsh–Ryan Arena (1,018); Evanston, IL
December 3, 2023*; 3:00 p.m., BTN		Georgetown	L 58–82	3–5	Welsh–Ryan Arena (1,587); Evanston, IL
December 10, 2023; 12:00 p.m., BTN+		at Maryland	L 58–71	3–6 (0–1)	Xfinity Center (5,127); College Park, MD
December 13, 2023*; 7:00 p.m., FloSports		at DePaul	L 65–90	3–7	Wintrust Arena (1,050); Chicago, IL
December 17, 2023*; 2:00 p.m., BTN+		Bradley	W 86–66	4–7	Welsh–Ryan Arena (1,797); Evanston, IL
December 21, 2023*; 10:00 a.m., ESPN+		at Temple	W 72–68	5–7	Liacouras Center (2,233); Philadelphia, PA
December 30, 2023; 2:00 p.m., BTN+		Rutgers	W 77–70	6–7 (1–1)	Welsh–Ryan Arena (1,820); Evanston, IL
January 2, 2024; 5:00 p.m., BTN+		at Penn State	L 55–95	6–8 (1–2)	Bryce Jordan Center (1,730); State College, PA
January 5, 2024; 7:00 p.m., BTN+		No. 20 Ohio State	L 60–90	6–9 (1–3)	Welsh–Ryan Arena (1,872); Evanston, IL
January 10, 2024; 6:30 p.m., BTN+		at Wisconsin	W 74–69	7–9 (2–3)	Kohl Center (2,827); Madison, WI
January 14, 2024; 2:00 p.m., BTN+		Illinois	L 52–93	7–10 (2–4)	Welsh–Ryan Arena (2,322); Evanston, IL
January 17, 2024; 5:30 p.m., BTN+		at Michigan State	L 72–91	7–11 (2–5)	Breslin Center (2,816); East Lansing, MI
January 25, 2024; 7:00 p.m., BTN		Penn State	L 65–76	7–12 (2–6)	Welsh–Ryan Arena (1,664); Evanston, IL
January 28, 2024; 1:00 p.m., BTN+		at No. 14 Indiana	L 68–71	7–13 (2–7)	Simon Skjodt Assembly Hall (7,132); Bloomington, IN
January 31, 2024; 7:00 p.m., Peacock		No. 3 Iowa	L 74–110	7–14 (2–8)	Welsh–Ryan Arena (7,039); Evanston, IL
February 4, 2024; 2:00 p.m., BTN+		Wisconsin	W 69–43	8–14 (3–8)	Welsh–Ryan Arena (2,721); Evanston, IL
February 8, 2024; 6:00 p.m., BTN+		at Illinois	L 71–82	8–15 (3–9)	State Farm Center (3,002); Champaign, IL
February 14, 2024; 7:00 p.m., BTN+		Purdue	L 48–74	8–16 (3–10)	Welsh–Ryan Arena (1,949); Evanston, IL
February 17, 2024; 2:00 p.m., BTN+		at Minnesota	L 63–88	8–17 (3–11)	Williams Arena (4,882); Minneapolis, MN
February 20, 2024; 8:00 p.m., BTN		at Nebraska	L 50–75	8–18 (3–12)	Pinnacle Bank Arena (4,238); Lincoln, NE
February 24, 2024; 2:00 p.m., BTN+		Michigan	L 60–74	8–19 (3–13)	Welsh–Ryan Arena (2,942); Evanston, IL
February 27, 2024; 6:00 p.m., BTN		No. 14 Indiana	L 64–84	8–20 (3–14)	Welsh–Ryan Arena (2,864); Evanston, IL
March 3, 2024; 1:00 p.m., BTN+		at Rutgers	W 72–61	9–20 (4–14)	Jersey Mike's Arena (3,571); Piscataway, NJ
Big Ten Women's Tournament
March 6, 2024; 8:00 p.m., Peacock	(13)	vs. (12) Purdue; First Round	L 72–78	9–21	Target Center; Minneapolis, MN
*Non-conference game. ^{#}Rankings from AP Poll. (#) Tournament seedings in parentheses. All times are in Central Time.

== See also ==
- 2023–24 Northwestern Wildcats men's basketball team
