= 2023–24 Michigan State Spartans women's basketball team =

Intercollegiate basketball season

2023–24 Michigan State Spartans women's basketball

Cherokee Invitational champions

NCAA tournament, First Round
- Conference: Big Ten Conference
- Record: 22–9 (12–6 Big Ten)
- Head coach: Robyn Fralick (1st season)
- Associate head coach: Kim Cameron
- Assistant coaches: Maria Kasza; Marwan Miller
- Home arena: Breslin Center

2023–24 Big Ten women's basketball standings
	Conf.				Overall
Team	W		L	PCT	W		L	PCT
No. 16 Ohio State	16	–	2	.889	26	–	6	.813
No. 2 Iowa †	15	–	3	.833	34	–	5	.872
No. 12 Indiana	15	–	3	.833	26	–	6	.813
Michigan State	12	–	6	.667	22	–	9	.710
Nebraska	11	–	7	.611	23	–	12	.657
Michigan	9	–	9	.500	20	–	14	.588
Penn State	9	–	9	.500	22	–	13	.629
Maryland	9	–	9	.500	19	–	14	.576
Illinois	8	–	10	.444	19	–	15	.559
Wisconsin	6	–	12	.333	15	–	17	.469
Minnesota	5	–	13	.278	20	–	16	.556
Purdue	5	–	13	.278	15	–	19	.441
Northwestern	4	–	14	.222	9	–	21	.300
Rutgers	2	–	16	.111	8	–	24	.250
† 2024 Big Ten tournament winner Rankings from AP Poll

The 2023–24 Michigan State Spartans women's basketball team represented Michigan State University as a member of the Big Ten Conference during the 2023–24 NCAA Division I women's basketball season. The Spartans, were led by first-year head coach Robyn Fralick and played their home games at Breslin Center in East Lansing, Michigan.

They finished the regular season 22–7, 12–6 in Big Ten play to finish in fourth place, marking the first time since 2016 that the team had double digit conference wins and won at least 22 games in a season. As a result, they earned a double bye in the Big Ten tournament. They lost to Nebraska in the quarterfinals of the tournament.

They received an at-large bid to the NCAA tournament as the No. 9 seed in Regional 1. There they lost to North Carolina in the first round.

== Previous season ==
The Spartans finished the 2022–23 season 16–14, 7–10 in Big Ten play to finish in ninth place. They defeated Nebraska in the second round of the Big Ten tournament before losing to Indiana. The Spartans were invited to the National Invitation Tournament, but declined the invitation due in part to the Michigan State shooting on campus.

On January 28, 2023, head coach Suzy Merchant was involved in an automobile crash which led to her being hospitalized. Assistant coach Dean Lockwood took over as the acting head coach for the remainder of the season. Merchant stepped down as head coach of the Spartans after the conclusion of the season. On March 31, the school named Bowling Green head coach Robyn Fralick the team's new head coach.

== Roster ==
2023–24 Michigan State Spartans women's basketball team
Players
Coaches

Pos.	#	Name	Height	Year	Previous school	Hometown
G	0	DeeDee Hagemann	5 ft 7 in (1.7 m)	Jr	Detroit Edison Public School Academy	Detroit, Michigan
G/F	1	Tory Ozment	6 ft 1 in (1.85 m)	GS	Buford High School	Buford, Georgia
G	2	Abbey Kimball	5 ft 10 in (1.78 m)	So	West Catholic High School	Grand Rapids, Michigan
G	3	Gabby Elliott	5 ft 10 in (1.78 m)	Sr	Clemson	Detroit, Michigan
G	4	Theryn Hallock	5 ft 10 in (1.78 m)	So	Forest Hills Central High School	Grand Rapids, Michigan
G	10	Bree Robinson	5 ft 8 in (1.73 m)	Fr	The Webb School	Mississauga, Ontario
G/F	11	Jocelyn Tate	5 ft 10 in (1.78 m)	Jr	Bowling Green	Pickerington, Ohio
F	12	Isaline Alexander	6 ft 3 in (1.91 m)	Jr	Bill Crothers Secondary School	Keswick, Ontario
C	21	Mary Meng	6 ft 5 in (1.96 m)	Fr	Midview High School	Grafton, Ohio
G	22	Moira Joiner	5 ft 10 in (1.78 m)	GS	Heritage High School	Saginaw, Michigan
G	24	Lauren Ross	5 ft 10 in (1.78 m)	RS Jr	Western Michigan	Muskegon, Michigan
G	35	Kennedy Blair	5 ft 9 in (1.75 m)	Fr	Divine Child High School	Dearborn, Michigan
G	40	Julia Ayrault	6 ft 2 in (1.88 m)	GS	Grosse Pointe North High School	Grosse Pointe Woods, Michigan

Head coach

- Robyn Fralick (Davidson)

Assistant coach(es)

- Kim Cameron (Michigan Tech)
- Maria Kasza (Michigan Tech)
- Marwan Miller (Franklin)

Legend

- (C) Team captain
- (S) Suspended
- (I) Ineligible
- (W) Walk-on
- Injured
- Current redshirt

Roster
Last update: January 13, 2024

== Schedule and results ==
Date time, TV	Rank^{#}	Opponent^{#}	Result	Record	Site (attendance) city, state
Exhibition
November 2, 2023*; 6:30 p.m., B1G+		Davenport	W 99–46		Breslin Center (2,481); East Lansing, MI
Regular season
November 8, 2023*; 6:30 p.m., B1G+		Oakland	W 87–62	1–0	Breslin Center (2,596); East Lansing, MI
November 12, 2023*; 2:00 p.m., B1G+		Wright State	W 99–55	2–0	Breslin Center (3,137); East Lansing, MI
November 16, 2023*; 6:30 p.m., B1G+		Detroit Mercy	W 105–44	3–0	Breslin Center (2,936); East Lansing, MI
November 19, 2023*; 1:00 p.m., B1G+		Evansville	W 105–49	4–0	Breslin Center (3,107); East Lansing, MI
November 23, 2023*; 6:30 p.m., FloSports		vs. James Madison; Cancún Challenge	W 95–69	5–0	Hard Rock Hotel Riviera Maya (197); Cancún, Mexico
November 24, 2023*; 4:00 p.m., FloSports		vs. Creighton; Cancún Challenge	L 69–83	5–1	Hard Rock Hotel Riviera Maya (250); Cancún, Mexico
November 30, 2023*; 7:00 p.m., CBSSN		at DePaul	W 102–64	6–1	Wintrust Arena (1,174); Chicago, IL
December 3, 2023*; 2:00 p.m., B1G+		Miami (OH)	W 89–44	7–1	Breslin Center (2,861); East Lansing, MI
December 9, 2023; 2:00 p.m., BTN		Nebraska	L 74–80	7–2 (0–1)	Breslin Center (3,194); East Lansing, MI
December 17, 2023*; 2:00 p.m., B1G+		Central Michigan	W 91–67	8–2	Breslin Center (4,340); East Lansing, MI
December 20, 2023*; 9:30 p.m., FloSports		vs. Richmond; Cherokee Invitational	W 83–76	9–2	The Cherokee Convention Center (302); Cherokee, NC
December 21, 2023*; 9:30 p.m.		vs. Coastal Carolina; Cherokee Invitational championship	W 105–66	10–2	The Cherokee Convention Center (723); Cherokee, NC
December 30, 2023; 4:00 p.m., BTN		at Penn State	W 98–87	11–2 (1–1)	Bryce Jordan Center (2,967); State College, PA
January 2, 2024; 9:00 p.m., Peacock		at No. 4 Iowa	L 73–76	11–3 (1–2)	Carver–Hawkeye Arena (14,998); Iowa City, IA
January 9, 2024; 6:00 p.m., BTN		Maryland	W 74–69	12–3 (2–2)	Breslin Center (2,886); East Lansing, MI
January 14, 2024; 4:00 p.m., BTN		at No. 17 Ohio State	L 65–70	12–4 (2–3)	Value City Arena (7,601); Columbus, OH
January 17, 2024; 6:30 p.m., B1G+		Northwestern	W 91–72	13–4 (3–3)	Breslin Center (2,816); East Lansing, MI
January 20, 2024; 3:00 p.m., B1G+		at Minnesota	L 50–69	13–5 (3–4)	Williams Arena (5,020); Minneapolis, MN
January 24, 2024; 6:30 p.m., B1G+		Purdue	W 97–70	14–5 (4–4)	Breslin Center (3,096); East Lansing, MI
January 27, 2024; 12:00 p.m., B1G+		Michigan	W 82–61	15–5 (5–4)	Breslin Center (9,385); East Lansing, MI
January 30, 2024; 7:00 p.m., B1G+		at Rutgers	W 82–64	16–5 (6–4)	Jersey Mike's Arena (1,409); Piscataway, NJ
February 5, 2024; 6:00 p.m., BTN		Minnesota	W 76–65	17–5 (7–4)	Breslin Center (3,154); East Lansing, MI
February 8, 2024; 7:00 p.m., Peacock		at No. 14 Indiana	L 91–94	17–6 (7–5)	Simon Skjodt Assembly Hall (8,580); Bloomington, IN
February 11, 2024; 4:00 p.m., Peacock		No. 5 Ohio State	L 71–86	17–7 (7–6)	Breslin Center (5,753); East Lansing, MI
February 18, 2024; 12:00 p.m., BTN		at Michigan	W 70–66	18–7 (8–6)	Crisler Center (10,461); Ann Arbor, MI
February 21, 2024; 7:00 p.m., B1G+		at Purdue	W 68–59	19–7 (9–6)	Mackey Arena (3,856); West Lafayette, IN
February 24, 2024; 2:00 p.m., B1G+		Rutgers	W 93–57	20–7 (10–6)	Breslin Center (7,696); East Lansing, MI
February 29, 2024; 8:00 p.m., BTN		Illinois	W 87–70	21–7 (11–6)	Breslin Center (3,392); East Lansing, MI
March 3, 2024; 1:00 p.m., B1G+		at Wisconsin	W 78–52	22–7 (12–6)	Kohl Center (4,542); Madison, WI
Big Ten tournament
March 8, 2024; 3:00 p.m., BTN	(4)	vs. (5) Nebraska; Quarterfinals	L 61–73	22–8	Target Center (18,481); Minneapolis, MN
NCAA tournament
March 22, 2024*; 11:30 a.m., ESPN2	(9 A1)	vs. (8 A1) North Carolina; First round	L 56–59	22–9	Colonial Life Arena; Columbia, SC
*Non-conference game. ^{#}Rankings from AP Poll. (#) Tournament seedings in parentheses. A1=Albany 1. All times are in Eastern Time.

== Rankings ==
Ranking movements Legend: ██ Increase in ranking ██ Decrease in ranking — = Not ranked RV = Received votes
	Week																			
Poll	Pre	1	2	3	4	5	6	7	8	9	10	11	12	13	14	15	16	17	18	Final
AP	—	—	—	—	RV	RV	RV	RV	RV	RV	RV	—	—	RV	RV	—	—	RV	—	—
Coaches	—	—	—	—	—	—	—	—	—	RV	RV	RV	RV	RV	RV	RV	RV	RV	—	—

== Awards and honors ==
=== Postseason awards ===
==== Julia Ayrault ====
- All-Big Ten First Team (unanimous)

==== Deedee Haemann ====
- All-Big Ten Second Team

==== Theryn Hallock ====
- Big Ten Sixth Player of the Year

==== Moira Joiner ====
- All-Big Ten Second Team
