= 2023–24 Wisconsin Badgers women's basketball team =

American college basketball season

2023–24 Wisconsin Badgers women's basketball

WNIT, Great 8
- Conference: Big Ten Conference
- Record: 15–17 (6–12 Big Ten)
- Head coach: Marisa Moseley (3rd season)
- Assistant coaches: Margaret McKeon; Tiffany Morton; Jaime Gluesing
- Home arena: Kohl Center

2023–24 Big Ten women's basketball standings
	Conf.				Overall
Team	W		L	PCT	W		L	PCT
No. 16 Ohio State	16	–	2	.889	26	–	6	.813
No. 2 Iowa †	15	–	3	.833	34	–	5	.872
No. 12 Indiana	15	–	3	.833	26	–	6	.813
Michigan State	12	–	6	.667	22	–	9	.710
Nebraska	11	–	7	.611	23	–	12	.657
Michigan	9	–	9	.500	20	–	14	.588
Penn State	9	–	9	.500	22	–	13	.629
Maryland	9	–	9	.500	19	–	14	.576
Illinois	8	–	10	.444	19	–	15	.559
Wisconsin	6	–	12	.333	15	–	17	.469
Minnesota	5	–	13	.278	20	–	16	.556
Purdue	5	–	13	.278	15	–	19	.441
Northwestern	4	–	14	.222	9	–	21	.300
Rutgers	2	–	16	.111	8	–	24	.250
† 2024 Big Ten tournament winner Rankings from AP Poll

The 2023–24 Wisconsin Badgers women's basketball team represented the University of Wisconsin–Madison in the 2023–24 NCAA Division I women's basketball season. Led by third-year head coach Marisa Moseley, the team played their games at Kohl Center and are members of the Big Ten Conference.

== Previous season ==
The Badgers finished the 2022–23 season 11–20, 6–12 in Big Ten play to finish in tenth place. As the No. 10 seed in the Big Ten tournament, they lost in the first round to Purdue.

== Offseason ==
=== Departures ===
Name	Number	Pos.	Height	Year	Hometown	Reason for departure
Julie Pospisilova	5	G	6'0"	Senior	Prague, Czech Republic	Graduated
Maty Wilke	11	G	5'10"	RS freshman	Beaver Dam, WI	Transferred to Utah
Avery LaBarbera	12	G	5'6"	GS senior	Harrison, NY	Graduated
Krystyna Ellew	14	G	5'10"	Sophomore	Chicago, IL	Transferred to UIC
Sara Stapleton	41	F/C	6'3"	Senior	Blaine, MN	Graduated
Mary Ferrito	44	G	5'10"	Freshman	Plain City, OH	Transferred to UNC Wilmington

==== Recruiting ====
There was no recruiting class of 2023.

== Roster ==
2023–24 Wisconsin Badgers women's basketball team
Players
Coaches

Pos.	#	Name	Height	Year	Previous school	Hometown
G	3	Brooke Schramek	6 ft 0 in (1.83 m)	Sr	Benet Academy	Naperville, IL
G	4	Lily Krahn	5 ft 10 in (1.78 m)	So	Prairie du Chien	Prairie du Chien, WI
G	5	Leena Patibandla	6 ft 0 in (1.83 m)	Fr	Jackson	Canton, OH
G	10	Halle Douglass	6 ft 1 in (1.85 m)	Sr	Lake Forest	Lake Forest, IL
G	11	Ana Guillen	6 ft 0 in (1.83 m)	Fr	Sant Andreu de Natzaret	Badalona, Spain
F	12	Tessa Grady	6 ft 2 in (1.88 m)	Fr	Dublin	Dublin, OH
G	13	Ronnie Porter	5 ft 4 in (1.63 m)	So	Como Park	St. Paul, MN
G	15	Sania Copeland	5 ft 7 in (1.7 m)	So	Olathe North	Kansas City, KS
F	20	Sacia Vanderpool	6 ft 4 in (1.93 m)	RS So	Byron	Byron, MN
C	22	Tessa Towers	6 ft 5 in (1.96 m)	Fr	Batavia	Batavia, IL
G	23	D'Yanis Jimenez	5 ft 8 in (1.73 m)	Fr	Charlotte	Cape Coral, FL
G	24	Natalie Leuzinger (W)	5 ft 8 in (1.73 m)	Sr	Black Hawk High School	Monroe, WI
F	25	Serah Williams	6 ft 4 in (1.93 m)	So	Niagara Prep	Brooklyn, NY
F	31	Imbie Jones	6 ft 2 in (1.88 m)	Fr	Garfield	Seattle, WA

Head coach

- Marisa Moseley (Boston University)

Assistant coach(es)

- Margaret McKeon (St. John's)
- Tiffany Morton (UW–Whitewater)
- Jaime Gluesing (Florida Gulf Coast)

Legend

- (C) Team captain
- (S) Suspended
- (I) Ineligible
- (W) Walk-on
- Injured
- Current redshirt

Roster

== Schedule and results ==
Date time, TV	Rank^{#}	Opponent^{#}	Result	Record	High points	High rebounds	High assists	Site (attendance) city, state
Exhibition
October 29, 2023*; 1:00 p.m., BTN+		UW–Whitewater	W 84–64		30 – Williams	6 – Leuzinger	8 – Porter	Kohl Center (3,461); Madison, WI
Regular season
November 7, 2023*; 6:30 p.m., BTN+		Milwaukee	W 62–51	1–0	18 – Williams	14 – Williams	4 – Copeland	Kohl Center (3,120); Madison, WI
November 9, 2023*; 7:00 p.m., BTN+		Western Illinois	W 74–52	2–0	13 – Leuzinger	13 – Porter	5 – Jimenez	Kohl Center (3,058); Madison, WI
November 14, 2023*; 6:30 p.m., BTN+		South Dakota State	W 66–64	3–0	17 – Porter	6 – Schramek	6 – Porter	Kohl Center (2,913); Madison, WI
November 19, 2023*; 4:00 p.m., ESPN+		at Kansas State	L 57–75	3–1	22 – Williams	9 – Williams	– Porter	Bramlage Coliseum (5,424); Manhattan, KS
November 24, 2023*; 1:00 p.m.		vs. Arkansas; Fort Myers Tip-Off semifinals	L 62–65	3–2	17 – Jimenez	10 – Porter	5 – Copeland	Suncoast Credit Union Arena (654); Fort Myers, FL
November 25, 2023*; 6:30 p.m.		vs. Boston College; Fort Myers Tip-Off 3rd place game	W 72–62	4–2	18 – Tied	8 – Williams	8 – Porter	Suncoast Credit Union Arena (397); Fort Myers, FL
November 29, 2023*; 6:30 p.m., BTN+		Northern Illinois	W 75–54	5–2	16 – Williams	8 – Leuzinger	6 – Jimenez	Kohl Center (2,886); Madison, WI
December 3, 2023*; 12:00 p.m., BTN+		Butler	L 51–59	5–3	24 – Williams	14 – Williams	4 – Copeland	Kohl Center (3,581); Madison, WI
December 10, 2023; 1:30 p.m., BTN		No. 4 Iowa	L 65–87	5–4 (0–1)	17 – Porter	8 – Williams	3 – Porter	Kohl Center (12,252); Madison, WI
December 13, 2023*; 7:00 p.m., SLN		at St. Thomas (MN)	W 78–55	6–4	21 – Williams	14 – Williams	5 – Porter	Schoenecker Arena (883); St. Paul, MN
December 21, 2023*; 6:30 p.m., BTN+		Eastern Illinois	W 76–64	7–4	19 – Jimenez	11 – Jimenez	7 – Porter	Kohl Center (3,622); Madison, WI
December 30, 2023; 5:00 p.m., BTN		at Purdue	L 50–89	7–5 (0–2)	15 – Leuzinger	5 – Tied	4 – Schramek	Mackey Arena (5,540); West Lafayette, IN
January 4, 2024; 8:00 p.m., BTN		Nebraska	L 57–69	7–6 (0–3)	16 – Williams	9 – Tied	7 – Porter	Kohl Center (2,852); Madison, WI
January 7, 2024; 2:00 p.m., BTN+		at Illinois	W 67–61	8–6 (1–3)	27 – Williams	15 – Williams	8 – Porter	State Farm Center (3,691); Champaign, IL
January 10, 2024; 6:30 p.m., BTN+		Northwestern	L 69–74	8–7 (1–4)	16 – Williams	10 – Williams	6 – Porter	Kohl Center (2,827); Madison, WI
January 13, 2024; 1:00 p.m., BTN+		at Michigan	L 52–76	8–8 (1–5)	11 – Williams	11 – Williams	4 – Leuzinger	Crisler Center (4,906); Ann Arbor, MI
January 16, 2024; 8:00 p.m., Peacock		at No. 2 Iowa	L 50–96	8–9 (1–6)	19 – Williams	14 – Williams	3 – Tied	Carver–Hawkeye Arena (14,998); Iowa City, IA
January 23, 2024; 8:00 p.m., BTN		Minnesota	W 59–56	9–9 (2–6)	24 – Williams	15 – Williams	4 – Porter	Kohl Center (4,191); Madison, WI
January 27, 2024; 2:00 p.m., BTN+		Rutgers	W 73–62	10–9 (3–6)	31 – Williams	12 – Williams	9 – Porter	Kohl Center (6,035); Madison, WI
February 1, 2024; 5:00 p.m., BTN		at No. 8 Ohio State	L 49–87	10–10 (3–7)	16 – Williams	11 – Williams	3 – Tied	Value City Arena (6,672); Columbus, OH
February 4, 2024; 2:00 p.m., BTN+		at Northwestern	L 43–69	10–11 (3–8)	11 – Williams	11 – Williams	2 – Tied	Welsh–Ryan Arena (2,721); Evanston, IL
February 11, 2024; 2:00 p.m., BTN+		Penn State	W 69–64	11–11 (4–8)	31 – Williams	15 – Williams	5 – Tied	Kohl Center (4,519); Madison, WI
February 14, 2024; 7:00 p.m., Peacock		No. 14 Indiana	L 54–68	11–12 (4–9)	18 – Williams	14 – Williams	2 – Tied	Kohl Center; Madison, WI
February 17, 2024; 2:00 p.m., BTN+		at Rutgers	W 61–43	12–12 (5–9)	17 – Williams	18 – Williams	7 – Porter	Jersey Mike's Arena (2,558); Piscataway, NJ
February 20, 2024; 6:00 p.m., BTN		at Minnesota	W 67–56	13–12 (6–9)	30 – Williams	15 – Williams	5 – Porter	Williams Arena (4,559); Minneapolis, MN
February 25, 2024; 3:00 p.m., BTN		Purdue	L 55–79	13–13 (6–10)	18 – Leuzinger	10 – Williams	5 – Copeland	Kohl Center (4,700); Madison, WI
February 29, 2024; 5:00 p.m., BTN		Maryland	L 63–79	13–14 (6–11)	16 – Leuzinger	10 – Williams	5 – Porter	Kohl Center (6,608); Madison, WI
March 3, 2024; 1:00 p.m., BTN+		Michigan State	L 52–78	13–15 (6–12)	17 – Williams	15 – Williams	4 – Porter	Kohl Center (4,542); Madison, WI
Big Ten Women's Tournament
March 7, 2024; 5:30 p.m., BTN	(10)	vs. (7) Penn State; Second Round	L 56–80	13–16	15 – Porter	10 – Williams	3 – Tied	Target Center (18,392); Minneapolis, MN
WNIT
March 25, 2024*; 7:00 p.m., ESPN+		at Southern Indiana; Second Round	W 67–62	14–16	24 – Williams	11 – Williams	3 – Tied	Screaming Eagles Arena (3,283); Evansville, IN
March 28, 2024*; 7:00 p.m., BTN+		Illinois State; Super 16	W 86–61	15–16	18 – Tied	8 – Porter	6 – Porter	Kohl Center (3,133); Madison, WI
April 1, 2024*; 7:00 p.m., BTN+		Saint Louis; Great 8	L 60–65	15–17	17 – Porter	7 – Douglass	4 – Douglass	Kohl Center (2,198); Madison, WI
*Non-conference game. ^{#}Rankings from AP Poll. (#) Tournament seedings in parentheses. All times are in Central.

== See also ==
- 2023–24 Wisconsin Badgers men's basketball team
