= Joe McKeown =

American basketball coach

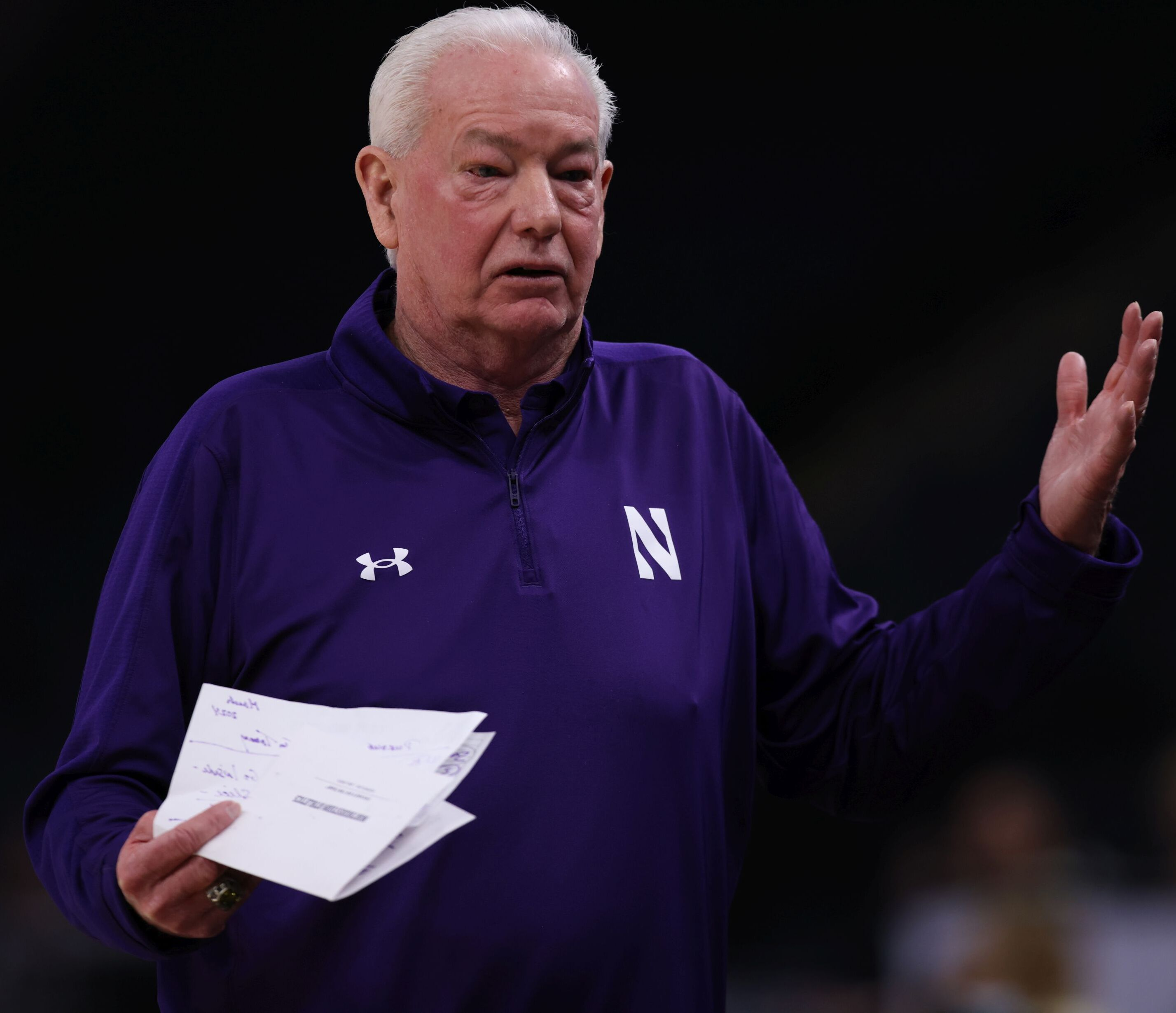
- McKeown in 2024

Biographical details
- Born: May 12, 1956 (age 70); Philadelphia, Pennsylvania, U.S.

Playing career
- 1974–1976: Mercer CC
- 1976–1978: Kent State

Coaching career (HC unless noted)
- 1979–1983: Kent State (asst.)
- 1983–1986: Oklahoma (asst.)
- 1986–1989: New Mexico State
- 1989–2008: George Washington
- 2008–2026: Northwestern

Head coaching record
- Overall: 785–453 (.634)

Accomplishments and honors

Championships
- 4× A-10 Tournament champion (1992, 1995, 1996, 2003); 10× A-10 regular season champion (1994–1998, 2002, 2003, 2006–2008); 8× A-10 West Division champion (1996–1998, 2000, 2002–2005); Big Ten regular season champion (2020)

Awards
- 5× A-10 Coach of the Year (1991, 1997, 2000, 2002, 2007); Big Ten Coach of the Year (2020)
Medal record
Head Coach for United States
World University Games
Gold medal – first place	2015 South Korea	Team competition

Joseph McKeown (/məˈkjuːən/ mə-KEW-ən; born May 12, 1956) is an American basketball coach and former player who recently served as the head women's basketball coach at Northwestern University. McKeown previously served as head coach at New Mexico State and George Washington University until joining Northwestern in 2008. He is the father of former Northwestern women's basketball player and current commentator Meghan McKeown.

== Playing career ==
McKeown attended Mercer County Community College and then was a star basketball player at Kent State, and was named co-captain during his senior season. After graduating, McKeown became an assistant at Kent State and then Oklahoma.

== Coaching career ==
He has over 750 wins as of March 5, 2024. He won the Atlantic 10 Conference's coach of the year award a record 5 times during his tenure at George Washington, and has also received the same honor in the Big Ten Conference. McKeown remains George Washington's all-time leading coach in terms of wins and winning percentage. His teams have reached the postseason 19 times, with a 20th postseason trip all but certain in 2020.

=== New Mexico State ===
In 1986, he was named head women's basketball coach at New Mexico State. He posted a 68–20 record.

=== George Washington University ===
In the 1991–92 season, he led the Colonials to a national ranking of 6th, which is the program's highest ranking ever. From 1991 to 1998, the team posted eight consecutive 20 win seasons including 5 Atlantic 10 titles. In 2007, he led the team to a 28–4 record, breaking school records for wins and winning percentage. He previously served as an assistant coach at Kent State, and Oklahoma. McKeown left George Washington after the 2007–08 season.

=== Northwestern University ===
McKeown and his family moved to Chicago to find better healthcare and services for his son with autism. Since 2008, he has been the head women's basketball coach at Northwestern University. McKeown was named Big Ten Coach of the Year in 2020 when the Wildcats, who had not been picked to finish in the league's top five in the preseason by league coaches and media and had been tapped by an ESPN panel to finish anywhere from 7th to 12th in the 14-team league, shared the Big Ten regular-season title with Maryland. On March 24, 2025, McKeown announced that he will retire at the end of the 2025–26 season.

== USA Basketball ==
McKeown was selected to be the head coach of the USA representative to the World University Games held in Seoul, South Korea July 5–13, 2015. The team won all six games, including the championship game against Canada. The first three quarters the game were quite close with four ties and four lead changes. In the fourth quarter the USA exploded for 34 points to pull out to a large lead, and won the gold-medal with a score of 82–63.

== Head coaching record ==
Record table
Season	Team	Overall	Conference	Standing	Postseason
New Mexico State Aggies (High Country Athletic Conference) (1986–1989)
1986–87	New Mexico State	23–7	10–2		
1987–88	New Mexico State	26–3	10–0		
1988–89	New Mexico State	19–10	8–2		
New Mexico State:		68–20 (.773)	28–4 (.875)		
George Washington Colonials (Atlantic 10 Conference) (1989–2008)
1989–90	George Washington	14–14	8–10	6th	
1990–91	George Washington	23–7	15–3	T–2nd	NCAA second round
1991–92	George Washington	25–7	11–5	T–2nd	NCAA second round
1992–93	George Washington	20–11	11–3	2nd	NWIT Consolation
1993–94	George Washington	23–8	13–3	T–1st	NCAA second round
1994–95	George Washington	26–6	14–2	1st	NCAA Sweet 16
1995–96	George Washington	26–7	14–2	1st (West)	NCAA second round
1996–97	George Washington	28–6	16–0	1st (West)	NCAA Elite Eight
1997–98	George Washington	20–10	12–4	1st (West)	NCAA second round
1998–99	George Washington	19–9	12–4	3rd	
1999–00	George Washington	26–6	14–2	1st (West)	NCAA second round
2000–01	George Washington	22–10	14–2	2nd	NCAA first round
2001–02	George Washington	21–9	15–1	1st (West)	WNIT Second round
2002–03	George Washington	25–7	15–1	1st (West)	NCAA second round
2003–04	George Washington	22–8	14–2	1st (West)	NCAA first round
2004–05	George Washington	23–9	13–3	T–1st (West)	NCAA second round
2005–06	George Washington	23–9	13–3	T–1st	NCAA second round
2006–07	George Washington	28–4	14–0	1st	NCAA Sweet 16
2007–08	George Washington	27–7	12–2	T–1st	NCAA Sweet 16
George Washington:		441–154 (.741)	250–52 (.828)		
Northwestern Wildcats (Big Ten Conference) (2008–2026)
2008–09	Northwestern	7–23	3–15	10th	
2009–10	Northwestern	18–15	7–11	T–8th	WNIT Third round
2010–11	Northwestern	19–14	6–10	8th	WNIT Second round
2011–12	Northwestern	14–16	4–12	11th	
2012–13	Northwestern	13–17	5–11	10th	
2013–14	Northwestern	17–16	5–11	T–8th	WNIT Third round
2014–15	Northwestern	23–9	12–6	T–4th	NCAA first round
2015–16	Northwestern	18–17	4–14	12th	WNIT First round
2016–17	Northwestern	20–11	8–8	T–8th	
2017–18	Northwestern	12–20	4–12	12th	
2018–19	Northwestern	21–15	9–9	6th	WNIT Runner-up
2019–20	Northwestern	26–4	16–2	T–1st	Postseason cancelled due to the COVID-19 pandemic.
2020–21	Northwestern	16–9	11–7	5th	NCAA second round
2021–22	Northwestern	17–12	8–8	7th	
2022–23	Northwestern	9–21	2–16	14th	
2023–24	Northwestern	9–21	4–14	13th	
2024–25	Northwestern	9–18	2–16	17th	
2025–26	Northwestern	8–21	2–16	17th	
Northwestern:		276–279 (.497)	112–198 (.361)		
Total:		785–453 (.634)			
National champion Postseason invitational champion Conference regular season champion Conference regular season and conference tournament champion Division regular season champion Division regular season and conference tournament champion Conference tournament champion

== See also ==
- List of college women's basketball career coaching wins leaders
