= 2022–23 Penn State Lady Lions basketball team =

Intercollegiate basketball season

2022–23 Penn State Lady Lions basketball
- Conference: Big Ten Conference
- Record: 14–17 (4–14 Big Ten)
- Head coach: Carolyn Kieger (4th season)
- Assistant coaches: Terri Williams; Sharnee Zoll-Norman; Tiffany Swoffard; Pam Brown; Natisha Hiedeman
- Home arena: Bryce Jordan Center

2022–23 Big Ten women's basketball standings
	Conf.				Overall
Team	W		L	PCT	W		L	PCT
No. 2 Indiana	16	–	2	.889	28	–	4	.875
No. 3 Iowa †	15	–	3	.833	31	–	7	.816
No. 7 Maryland	15	–	3	.833	28	–	7	.800
No. 12 Ohio State	12	–	6	.667	28	–	8	.778
No. 18 Michigan	11	–	7	.611	23	–	10	.697
Illinois	11	–	7	.611	22	–	10	.688
Purdue	9	–	8	.529	19	–	11	.633
Nebraska	8	–	10	.444	18	–	15	.545
Michigan State	7	–	10	.412	16	–	14	.533
Wisconsin	6	–	12	.333	11	–	20	.355
Rutgers	5	–	13	.278	12	–	20	.375
Minnesota	4	–	14	.222	11	–	19	.367
Penn State	4	–	14	.222	14	–	17	.452
Northwestern	2	–	16	.111	9	–	21	.300
† 2023 Big Ten tournament winner As of April 2, 2023; Rankings from AP poll

The 2022–23 Penn State Lady Lions basketball team represented Pennsylvania State University during the 2022–23 NCAA Division I women's basketball season. The Lady Lions were led by fourth-year head coach Carolyn Kieger and played their home games at the Bryce Jordan Center as members of the Big Ten Conference.

== Previous season ==
The Lady Lions finished the season 11–18 and 5–13 in Big Ten play to finish in a tie for eleventh place. As the twelfth seed in the Big Ten tournament, they were defeated by Rutgers in the first round. They were not invited to the NCAA tournament or the WNIT.

== Offseason ==
=== Departures ===
Name	Number	Pos.	Height	Year	Hometown	Reason for departure
Ivane Tensaie	0	G	5'7"	Sophomore	Roseville, MN	Transferred to UTEP
Aicha Dia	2	F	6'1"	Freshman	Montreal, QC	Transferred to Cincinnati
Ymke Brouwer	3	F	6'0"	(redshirt) Freshman	Zürich, Switzerland	Transferred to Manhattan
Anna Camden	11	F	6'3"	Senior	Downingtown, PA	Graduate transferred to Richmond
Kayla Thomas	12	F	6'3"	Sophomore	Beltsville, MD	Transferred to Georgia Southern
Taniyah Thompson	23	G	5'11"	Senior	Hamden, CT	Graduate transferred to Georgia
Alexa Williamson	24	F	6'2"	GS senior	Houston, PA	Graduated
Johnasia Cash	33	F	6'3"	GS senior	McKeesport, PA	Graduated

=== Incoming transfers ===
Name	Number	Pos.	Height	Year	Hometown	Previous school

== Roster ==
2022–23 Penn State Nittany Lions women's basketball team
Players
Coaches

Pos.	#	Name	Height	Year	Previous school	Hometown
F	1	Ali Brigham	6 ft 4 in (1.93 m)	Fr	Franklin/George Mason	Franklin, MA
G	4	Niya Beverly	5 ft 7 in (1.7 m)	Sr	St. John's College/Wisconsin	Laurel, MD
G	5	Leilani Kapinus	5 ft 10 in (1.78 m)	Fr	James Madison Memorial	Madison, WI
G	10	Tova Sabel	5 ft 10 in (1.78 m)	Fr	Bromma Gymnasium	Stockholm, Sweden
F	11	Anna Camden	6 ft 3 in (1.91 m)	So	Shipley	Downingtown, PA
G	15	Maddie Burke	6 ft 0 in (1.83 m)	Fr	Central Bucks West	Doylestown, PA
G	20	Makenna Marisa	5 ft 11 in (1.8 m)	So	Peters Township	McMurry, PA
G	22	Alli Campbell	6 ft 0 in (1.83 m)	Fr	Bellwood-Antis/Notre Dame	Altoona, PA
G	23	Shay Hagans	5 ft 6 in (1.68 m)	So	Osbourn Park	Manassas, VA
G	25	Kelly Jekot	6 ft 0 in (1.83 m)	Sr	Cumberland Valley/Villanova	Enola, PA

Head coach

- Carolyn Kieger (Marquette)

Assistant coach(es)

- Terri Williams (Penn State)
- Sharnee Zoll-Norman (Virginia)
- Tiffany Swoffard (Austin Peay)
- Pam Brown (Charlotte)
- Natisha Hiedeman (Marquette)

Legend

- (C) Team captain
- (S) Suspended
- (I) Ineligible
- (W) Walk-on
- Injured
- Current redshirt

Roster
Last update: May 6, 2022

== Schedule and results ==
Date time, TV	Rank^{#}	Opponent^{#}	Result	Record	Site (attendance) city, state
Regular season
November 9, 2022*; 7:00 p.m., BTN+		Norfolk State	W 67–11	1–0	Bryce Jordan Center (1,777); State College, PA
November 11, 2022*; 7:00 p.m., BTN+		Fairfield	W 77–49	2–0	Bryce Jordan Center (1,959); State College, PA
November 15, 2022*; 7:00 p.m., BTN+		Youngstown State	W 77–63	3–0	Bryce Jordan Center (1,541); State College, PA
November 18, 2022*; 7:00 p.m., BTN+		Bryant	W 96–33	4–0	Bryce Jordan Center (1,565); State College, PA
November 21, 2022*; 7:00 p.m., BTN+		Syracuse	W 82–69	5–0	Bryce Jordan Center (1,650); State College, PA
November 25, 2022*; 1:15 p.m., FloSports		vs. Toledo; Daytona Beach Invitational	W 60–59	6–0	Ocean Center (350); Daytona Beach, FL
November 26, 2022*; 11:00 a.m., FloSports		Fresno State; Daytona Beach Invitational Championship	W 68–49	7–0	Ocean Center (145); Daytona Beach, FL
November 30, 2022*; 7:00 p.m., BTN+		Virginia; ACC/Big Ten Challenge	L 68–89	7–1	Bryce Jordan Center (1,823); State College, PA
December 3, 2022; 8:30 p.m., BTN		at Minnesota	L 96–98 ^{2OT}	7–2 (0–1)	Williams Arena (2,852); Minneapolis, MN
December 8, 2022; 7:00 p.m., BTN+		No. 4 Indiana	L 58–67	7–3 (0–2)	Bryce Jordan Center (1,621); State College, PA
December 11, 2023*; 4:00 p.m., BTN+		West Virginia	W 69–57	8–3 (0–2)	Bryce Jordan Center (2,218); State College, PA
December 18, 2022*; 2:00 9.m., FloSports		Drexel	L 82–86 ^{OT}	8–4 (0–2)	Daskalakis Athletic Center (989); Philadelphia, PA
December 21, 2022*; 12:00 p.m., BTN+		Cornell	W 79–48	9–4 (0–2)	Bryce Jordan Center (1,589); State College, PA
December 30, 2022; 5:00 p.m., BTN+		Rutgers	W 90–72	10–4 (1–2)	Bryce Jordan Center (2,368); State College, PA
January 3, 2023; 1:00 p.m., BTN+		at No. 14 Michigan	L 72–82	10–5 (1–3)	Crisler Center (3,237); Ann Arbor, MI
January 7, 2023; 2:00 p.m., BTN+		Purdue	W 70–60	11–5 (2–3)	Bryce Jordan Center (2,367); State College, PA
January 11, 2023; 7:00 p.m., BTN+		at Nebraska	L 51–80	11–6 (2–4)	Pinnacle Bank Arena (4,526); Lincoln, NE
January 14, 2023; 12:30 p.m., BTN		at No. 12 Iowa	L 67–108	11–7 (2–5)	Carver-Hawkeye Arena (12,436); Iowa City, IA
January 18, 2023; 7:00 p.m., BTN		Minnesota	L 67–75	11–8 (2–6)	Bryce Jordan Center (2,001); State College, PA
January 22, 2023; 5:00 p.m., BTN		Wisconsin	W 74–69	12–8 (3–6)	Bryce Jordan Center (2,310); State College, PA
January 26, 2023; 7:00 p.m., BTN+		at Rutgers	L 82–86 ^{OT}	12–9 (3–7)	Jersey Mike's Arena (1,204); Piscataway, NJ
January 30, 2023; 6:00 p.m., BTN		at No. 8 Maryland	L 66–87	12–10 (3–8)	Xfinity Center (1,585); College Park, MD
February 2, 2023; 7:00 p.m., BTN+		Northwestern	W 74–64	13–10 (4–8)	Bryce Jordan Center (1,977); State College
February 12, 2023; 12:00 p.m., BTN		No. 6 Iowa	L 51–95	13–11 (4–9)	Bryce Jordan Center (5,228); State College, PA
February 12, 2023; 3:00 p.m., BTN+		at Michigan State	L 75–81 ^{OT}	13–12 (4–10)	Breslin Student Events Center (5,355); East Lansing, MI
February 16, 2023; 7:00 p.m., BTN+		No. 13 Ohio State	L 55–67	13–13 (4–11)	Bryce Jordan Center Center; State College, PA
February 19, 2023; 2:00 p.m., BTN+		at Illinois	L 62–85	13–14 (4–12)	State Farm Center (6,299); Champaign, IL
February 22, 2023; 7:00 p.m., BTN+		at Purdue	L 62–86	13–15 (4–13)	Mackey Arena (3,403); West Lafayette, IN
February 25, 2023; 2:00 p.m., BTN+		Michigan State	L 65–80	13–16 (4–14)	Bryce Jordan Center (4,394); State College, PA
Big Ten Women's Tournament
March 1, 2023; 2:00 p.m., BTN	(13)	vs. (12) Minnesota; First Round	W 72–67	14–16	Target Center; Minneapolis, MN
March 2, 2023; 3:00 p.m., BTN	(13)	vs. (5) Michigan; Second Round	L 61–63	14–17	Target Center (4,908); Minneapolis, MN
*Non-conference game. ^{#}Rankings from AP Poll. (#) Tournament seedings in parentheses. All times are in Eastern Time.

== Rankings ==
Ranking movements Legend: — = Not ranked
	Week																				
Poll	Pre	1	2	3	4	5	6	7	8	9	10	11	12	13	14	15	16	17	18	19	Final
AP	—	—	—	—	—	—	—	—	—	—	—	—	—	—	—	—	—	—	—	—	Not released
Coaches	—	—	—	—	—	—	—	—	—	—	—	—	—	—	—	—	—	—	—	—	

Legend
	Increase in ranking
	Decrease in ranking
	Not ranked previous week
(RV)	Received votes
(NR)	Not ranked and did not receive votes
т	Tied with team above or below also with this symbol
