= 2022–23 Minnesota Golden Gophers women's basketball team =

Intercollegiate basketball season

2022–23 Minnesota Golden Gophers women's basketball
- Conference: Big Ten Conference
- Record: 11–19 (4–14 Big Ten)
- Head coach: Lindsay Whalen (5th season)
- Assistant coaches: Shimmy Gray-Miller; Kelly Curry; Marwan Miller
- Home arena: Williams Arena

2022–23 Big Ten women's basketball standings
	Conf.				Overall
Team	W		L	PCT	W		L	PCT
No. 2 Indiana	16	–	2	.889	28	–	4	.875
No. 3 Iowa †	15	–	3	.833	31	–	7	.816
No. 7 Maryland	15	–	3	.833	28	–	7	.800
No. 12 Ohio State	12	–	6	.667	28	–	8	.778
No. 18 Michigan	11	–	7	.611	23	–	10	.697
Illinois	11	–	7	.611	22	–	10	.688
Purdue	9	–	8	.529	19	–	11	.633
Nebraska	8	–	10	.444	18	–	15	.545
Michigan State	7	–	10	.412	16	–	14	.533
Wisconsin	6	–	12	.333	11	–	20	.355
Rutgers	5	–	13	.278	12	–	20	.375
Minnesota	4	–	14	.222	11	–	19	.367
Penn State	4	–	14	.222	14	–	17	.452
Northwestern	2	–	16	.111	9	–	21	.300
† 2023 Big Ten tournament winner As of April 2, 2023; Rankings from AP poll

The 2022–23 Minnesota Golden Gophers women's basketball team represented the University of Minnesota during the 2022–23 NCAA Division I women's basketball season. The Golden Gophers, led by fifth-year head coach Lindsay Whalen, played their home games at Williams Arena and competed as members of the Big Ten Conference.

== Previous season ==
The Golden Gophers finished the 2021–2022 season with a 14–17 record and 7–11 in Big Ten play to finish in tenth place. As the tenth seed in the Big Ten tournament, they were defeated by Northwestern in the second round. They were not invited to the NCAA Tournament, but were chosen as an at-large team for the WNIT. They lost in the second round of the WNIT to the eventual champions, South Dakota State.

== Offseason ==
=== Departures ===
Name	Number	Pos.	Height	Year	Hometown	Reason for departure
Alexia Smith	1	G	5'8"	Sophomore	Columbus, Ohio	Transferred to Virginia
Deja Winters	3	G	5'11"	Graduate student	Cleveland, Ohio	Graduated
Jasmine Powell	4	G	5'6"	Junior	Detroit, Michigan	Transferred to Tennessee
Erin Hedman	10	F	6'3"	Sophomore	New Berlin, Wisconsin	Transferred to Sacramento State
Laura Bagwell Katalinich	12	F	6'0"	Graduate student	Minneapolis, Minnesota	Graduated
Gadiva Hubbard	13	G	5'9"	Graduate student	Virginia Beach, Virginia	Graduated
Sara Scalia	14	G	5'10"	Junior	Stillwater, Minnesota	Transferred to Indiana
Kayla Mershon	15	F	6'3"	Senior	Minnetonka, Minnesota	Graduated
Caroline Strande	21	G	5'11	Sophomore	Racine, Wisconsin	Transferred to Butler
Klarke Sconiers	25	C	6'2"	Junior	Queens, New York	Transferred to Delaware
Kadi Sissoko	30	F	6'2"	Redshirt junior	Paris, France	Transferred to USC
Bailey Helgren	35	C	6'5"	Graduate student	Edina, Minnesota	Graduated
Grace Cumming	43	F	6'3"	Redshirt sophomore	Des Moines, Iowa	Medically retired from basketball

=== Arrivals ===
Name	Number	Pos.	Height	Year	Hometown	Previous school	Notes
Aminata Zie	11	F/C	6'1"	Redshirt sophomore	Paris, France	Western Nebraska CC	Previously also played at Stony Brook
Destinee Oberg	13	C	6'3"	Senior	Burnsville, Minnesota	Arkansas	
Isabelle Gradwell	14	G/F	6'1"	Graduate student	Marshalltown, Iowa	Cleveland State	
Angelina Hammond	15	G/F	5'11"	Graduate student	Hopkins, Minnesota	Miami Dade College	Previously also played at Siena and Southeastern
Mi'Cole Cayton	21	G	5'9"	Graduate student	Stockton, California	Nebraska	Previously also played at California

=== 2022 recruiting class ===
The Gophers signed four players from the state of Minnesota for their 2022 class. They signed their highest-rated recruiting class in program history, and were considered to be a top ten class in the nation.

College recruiting
Name	Hometown	School	Height	Weight	Commit date
Mara Braun; G	Wayzata, MN	Wayzata High School	5 ft 11 in (1.80 m)	N/A	
Mara Braun; G	Recruit ratings: ESPN: (95)				
Amaya Battle; G	Hopkins, MN	Hopkins High School	5 ft 11 in (1.80 m)	N/A	
Amaya Battle; G	Recruit ratings: ESPN: (95)				
Mallory Heyer; F	Chaska, MN	Chaska High School	6 ft 1 in (1.85 m)	N/A	
Mallory Heyer; F	Recruit ratings: ESPN: (94)				
Nia Holloway; F	Eden Prairie, MN	Eden Prairie High School	6 ft 0 in (1.83 m)	N/A	
Nia Holloway; F	Recruit ratings: No ratings found				
Overall recruit ranking:
Note: In many cases, Scout, Rivals, 247Sports, On3, and ESPN may conflict in their listings of height and weight.; In these cases, the average was taken. ESPN grades are on a 100-point scale.; Sources:

== Roster ==
2022–23 Minnesota Golden Gophers women's basketball team
Players
Coaches

Pos.	#	Name	Height	Year	Previous school	Hometown
G	3	Amaya Battle	5 ft 11 in (1.8 m)	Fr	Hopkins	Hopkins, MN
F	4	Alanna Micheaux	6 ft 2 in (1.88 m)	So	Wayne Memorial	Wayne, MI
G	5	Maggie Czinano	6 ft 0 in (1.83 m)	So	Watertown-Mayer	Watertown, MN
G	10	Mara Braun	6 ft 0 in (1.83 m)	Fr	Wayzata	Wayzata, MN
F/C	11	Aminata Zie (injured)	6 ft 1 in (1.85 m)	RS So	Western Nebraska CC; Stony Brook	Paris, France
G	12	Alexa Ratzlaff	5 ft 9 in (1.75 m)	Fr	Rosemount	Rosemount, MN
C	13	Destinee Oberg	6 ft 3 in (1.91 m)	Sr	Arkansas	Burnsville, MN
G/F	14	Isabelle Gradwell	6 ft 1 in (1.85 m)	GS	Cleveland State	Marshalltown, IA
G/F	15	Angelina Hammond	5 ft 11 in (1.8 m)	GS	Miami Dade College; Siena; Southeastern	Hopkins, MN
G	21	Mi'Cole Cayton	5 ft 9 in (1.75 m)	GS	Nebraska; California	Stockton, CA
G	23	Katie Borowicz	5 ft 7 in (1.7 m)	RS Fr	Roseau	Roseau, MN
F	24	Mallory Heyer	6 ft 1 in (1.85 m)	Fr	Chaska	Chaska, MN
G/F	31	Maria Counts	5 ft 11 in (1.8 m)	Fr	Providence Academy	Plymouth, MN
F	41	Niamya Holloway (injured)	6 ft 0 in (1.83 m)	Fr	Eden Prairie	Eden Prairie, MN

Head coach

- Lindsay Whalen (Minnesota)

Assistant coach(es)

- Shimmy Gray-Miller (Michigan)
- Kelly Curry (Minnesota)
- Marwin Miller (Franklin (OH))

Legend

- (C) Team captain
- (S) Suspended
- (I) Ineligible
- (W) Walk-on
- Injured
- Current redshirt

Roster
Last update: August 12, 2022

== Schedule and results ==
Date time, TV	Rank^{#}	Opponent^{#}	Result	Record	Site (attendance) city, state
Exhibition
October 30, 2022*; 2:00 pm, BTN Plus		Wisconsin-River Falls	W 104–64		Williams Arena; Minneapolis, MN
Regular season
November 7, 2022*; 5:30 pm, BTN Plus		Western Illinois	W 75–45	1–0	Williams Arena (2,242); Minneapolis, MN
November 13, 2022*; 3:00 pm, BTN Plus		Lehigh	W 101–99	2–0	Williams Arena (3,724); Minneapolis, MN
November 17, 2022*; 7:00 pm, ESPN+		at North Dakota State	L 65–71	2–1	Scheels Center (1,759); Fargo, ND
November 20, 2022*; 2:00 pm		Presbyterian	W 82–48	3–1	Williams Arena (2,505); Minneapolis, MN
November 26, 2022*; 1:00 pm, ACCNX		at Virginia; Cav Classic	L 70–73	3–2	John Paul Jones Arena (2,871); Charlottesville, VA
November 27, 2022*; 4:00 pm		vs. Liberty; Cav Classic	W 77–65	4–2	John Paul Jones Arena (236); Charlottesville, VA
November 30, 2022*; 7:00 pm, BTN		Wake Forest; Big Ten/ACC Challenge	L 59–63	4–3	Williams Arena (2,177); Minneapolis, MN
December 3, 2022; 5:00/7:30 pm, BTN		Penn State	W 98–96 ^{2OT}	5–3 (1–0)	Williams Arena (2,852); Minneapolis, MN
December 7, 2022*; 7:00 pm		Kentucky	L 74–80	5–4 (1–0)	Williams Arena (2,495); Minneapolis, MN
December 10, 2022; 8:00 pm, BTN		at No. 16 Iowa	L 64–87	5–5 (1–1)	Carver-Hawkeye Arena (8,946); Iowa City, IA
December 12, 2022*; 7:00 pm		Chicago State	W 105–54	6–5 (1–1)	Williams Arena (2,083); Minneapolis, MN
December 14, 2022*; 11:00 am		Milwaukee	W 75–59	7–5 (1–1)	Williams Arena (6,291); Minneapolis, MN
December 22, 2022*; 3:30 pm		Eastern Illinois	W 59–48	8–5 (1–1)	Williams Arena (3,038); Minneapolis, MN
December 30, 2022; 1:00 pm		at No. 16 Maryland	L 85–107	8–6 (1–2)	Xfinity Center (6,006); College Park, MD
January 5, 2023; 7:00 pm		No. 3 Ohio State	L 71–83	8–7 (1–3)	Williams Arena (2,410); Minneapolis, MN
January 8, 2023; 3:00 pm		at Wisconsin	L 77–81	8–8 (1–4)	Kohl Center (3,445); Madison, WI
January 12, 2023; 7:30 pm, BTN		Rutgers	L 59–65	8–9 (1–5)	Williams Arena (2,238); Minneapolis, MN
January 15, 2023; 2:00 pm		No. 24 Illinois	L 57–70	8–10 (1–6)	Williams Arena (4,454); Minneapolis, MN
January 18, 2023; 6:00 pm		at Penn State	W 75–67	9–10 (2–6)	Bryce Jordan Center (2,001); University Park, PA
January 21, 2023; 2:00 pm		at Purdue	L 56–75	9–11 (2–7)	Mackey Arena (5,003); West Lafayette, IN
January 29, 2023; 2:00 pm		No. 13 Michigan	L 41–77	9–12 (2–8)	Williams Arena (4,545); Minneapolis, MN
February 1, 2023; 7:00 pm		No. 4 Indiana	L 54–77	9–13 (2–9)	Williams Arena (4,129); Minneapolis, MN
February 5, 2023; 2:00 pm		at Illinois	L 62–69	9–14 (2–10)	State Farm Center (4,533); Champaign, IL
February 8, 2023; 6:00 pm		at No. 13 Ohio State	L 63–93	9–15 (2–11)	Value City Arena (4,357); Columbus, OH
February 11, 2023; 3:00 pm		Wisconsin	L 70–76	9–16 (2–12)	Williams Arena (4,538); Minneapolis, MN
February 15, 2023; 7:00 pm		Nebraska	W 95–92	10–16 (3–12)	Williams Arena (3,268); Minneapolis, MN
February 18, 2023; 2:00 p.m.		at Northwestern	L 62–76	10–17 (3–13)	Welsh-Ryan Arena (1,582); Evanston, IL
February 22, 2023; 4:30 pm		at Michigan State	L 67–71	10–18 (3–14)	Breslin Center (2,392); East Lansing, MI
February 26, 2023; 2:00 pm		Purdue	W 77–69	11–18 (4–14)	Williams Arena (4,014); Minneapolis, MN
Big Ten Tournament
March 1, 2023; 1:00 pm, BTN	(12)	vs. (13) Penn State; First round	L 67–72	11–19	Target Center (4,890); Minneapolis, MN
*Non-conference game. ^{#}Rankings from AP Poll. (#) Tournament seedings in parentheses. All times are in Central Time.

== Rankings ==
+ Regular season polls	Poll	Pre- season	Week 2	Week 3	Week 4	Week 5	Week 6	Week 7	Week 8	Week 9	Week 10	Week 11	Week 12	Week 13	Week 14	Week 15	Week 16	Final
AP																		
Coaches																		

Legend
	Increase in ranking
	Decrease in ranking
	Not ranked previous week
(RV)	Received votes
(NR)	Not ranked and did not receive votes
