= 2022–23 Purdue Boilermakers women's basketball team =

American college basketball season

2022–23 Purdue Boilermakers women's basketball

NCAA tournament, First Four
- Conference: Big Ten Conference
- Record: 19–11 (9–8 Big Ten)
- Head coach: Katie Gearlds (2nd season)
- Assistant coaches: Beth Couture; Michael Scruggs; Alex Guyton
- Home arena: Mackey Arena

2022–23 Big Ten women's basketball standings
| | Conf. | | | | Overall |
| Team | W | | L | PCT | W | | L | PCT |
|---|---|---|---|---|---|---|---|---|
| No. 2 Indiana | 16 | – | 2 | .889 | 28 | – | 4 | .875 |
| No. 3 Iowa † | 15 | – | 3 | .833 | 31 | – | 7 | .816 |
| No. 7 Maryland | 15 | – | 3 | .833 | 28 | – | 7 | .800 |
| No. 12 Ohio State | 12 | – | 6 | .667 | 28 | – | 8 | .778 |
| No. 18 Michigan | 11 | – | 7 | .611 | 23 | – | 10 | .697 |
| Illinois | 11 | – | 7 | .611 | 22 | – | 10 | .688 |
| Purdue | 9 | – | 8 | .529 | 19 | – | 11 | .633 |
| Nebraska | 8 | – | 10 | .444 | 18 | – | 15 | .545 |
| Michigan State | 7 | – | 10 | .412 | 16 | – | 14 | .533 |
| Wisconsin | 6 | – | 12 | .333 | 11 | – | 20 | .355 |
| Rutgers | 5 | – | 13 | .278 | 12 | – | 20 | .375 |
| Minnesota | 4 | – | 14 | .222 | 11 | – | 19 | .367 |
| Penn State | 4 | – | 14 | .222 | 14 | – | 17 | .452 |
| Northwestern | 2 | – | 16 | .111 | 9 | – | 21 | .300 |
† 2023 Big Ten tournament winner As of April 2, 2023; Rankings from AP poll

The 2022–23 Purdue Boilermakers women's basketball team represented Purdue University during the 2022–23 NCAA Division I women's basketball season. The Boilermakers, led by second-year head coach Katie Gearlds, played their home games at Mackey Arena and were a member of the Big Ten Conference.

The Boilermakers finished the season with a 19–11 overall record and a 9–8 record within the Big Ten. In the Big Ten Women's Tournament, the team advanced to the quarterfinals where they were defeated 58–69 by the 7th seeded Iowa Hawkeyes. The 2022–23 season featured the first NCAA Women's Tournament appearance for the Boilermakers since the 2016-17 season. The Boilermakers fell in the First Four to St. John's. Fourth-year guard Jeanae Terry was named second-team all-Big Ten by the league's coaches.

== Previous season ==
They finished the season 17–15 and 7–11 in Big Ten play to finish in a tie for ninth place. As the ninth seed in the Big Ten tournament, they were defeated by Michigan State in the second round. They received an at-large bid to the WNIT. They defeated Southern Illinois in the First Round before losing to Marquette in the Second Round to end their season.

== Roster ==
2022–23 Purdue Boilermakers women's basketball team
Players
Coaches

| Pos. | # | Name | Height | Year | Previous school | Hometown |
|---|---|---|---|---|---|---|
| G | 2 | Ainhoa Holzer | 5 ft 9 in (1.75 m) | Fr | Lycée-Collège des Creusets; Christ the King, NY | Martigny, Switzerland |
| G | 3 | Jayla Smith | 6 ft 0 in (1.83 m) | So | Lawrence North | Indianapolis, IN |
| G | 4 | Kate Rudini | 5 ft 9 in (1.75 m) | Fr | Saint Joseph | Trumbull, CT |
| G | 5 | Cassidy Hardin | 5 ft 10 in (1.78 m) | RS Sr | Center Grove | Bargersville, IN |
| G | 10 | Jeanae Terry | 5 ft 11 in (1.8 m) | Sr | Wayne Memorial; Illinois | Detroit, MI |
| G | 11 | Lasha Petree | 6 ft 0 in (1.83 m) | GS | Arbor Prep; Rutgers | Detroit, MI |
| G/F | 14 | Ava Learn | 6 ft 1 in (1.85 m) | So | Our Lady of Lourdes | Hyde Park, NY |
| G | 23 | Abbey Ellis | 5 ft 6 in (1.68 m) | Sr | Our Lady of Mercy; Cal Poly | Melbourne, Australia |
| G | 30 | Addison Potts | 6 ft 0 in (1.83 m) | Fr | South Fort Myers | Fort Myers, FL |
| F | 31 | Lilly Stoddard | 6 ft 4 in (1.93 m) | Fr | Crown Point | Crown Point, IN |
| G | 33 | Madison Layden | 6 ft 1 in (1.85 m) | Jr | Northwestern | Kokomo, IN |
| F | 34 | Caitlyn Harper | 6 ft 2 in (1.88 m) | RS Sr | Arrowhead; California Baptist | Hartland, WI |
| F | 35 | Rickie Woltman | 6 ft 4 in (1.93 m) | Sr | Incarnate Word | St. Louis, MO |

Head coach

- Katie Gearlds (Purdue)

Assistant coach(es)

- Beth Couture (Erskine)
- Michael Scruggs (Tennessee)
- Alex Guyton (Purdue)

Legend

- (C) Team captain
- (S) Suspended
- (I) Ineligible
- (W) Walk-on
- Injured
- Current redshirt

Roster

== Schedule and results ==
| Date time, TV | Rank^{#} | Opponent^{#} | Result | Record | Site (attendance) city, state |
Exhibition
| November 6, 2022*; 2:00 p.m. | | Purdue Northwest | W 98–67 | | Mackey Arena (2,740); West Lafayette, IN |
Regular season
| November 10, 2022*; 6:00 p.m. | | Marshall | W 73–61 | 1–0 | Mackey Arena (2,058); West Lafayette, IN |
| November 13, 2022*; 2:00 p.m. | | Murray State | W 90–61 | 2–0 | Mackey Arena (2,866); West Lafayette, IN |
| November 17, 2022*; 7:00 p.m. | | SIU Edwardsville | W 100–58 | 3–0 | Mackey Arena (1,861); West Lafayette, IN |
| November 20, 2022*; 2:00 p.m. | | Indiana State | W 77–54 | 4–0 | Mackey Arena (3,053); West Lafayette, IN |
| November 24, 2022*; 1:30 p.m., FloHoops | | vs. Harvard; Cancún Challenge | W 85–63 | 5–0 | Hard Rock Hotel Riviera Maya (200); Cancún, Mexico |
| November 25, 2022*; 1:30 p.m., FloHoops | | vs. Florida State; Cancún Challenge | L 75–76 | 5–1 | Hard Rock Hotel Riviera Maya (248); Cancún, Mexico |
| November 26, 2022*; 1:30 p.m., FloHoops | | vs. Oklahoma State; Cancún Challenge | W 71–65 | 6–1 | Hard Rock Hotel Riviera Maya (248); Cancún, Mexico |
| November 30, 2022*; 6:00 p.m., BTN | | Syracuse; ACC–Big Ten Women's Challenge | W 87–78 | 7–1 | Mackey Arena (2,521); West Lafayette, IN |
| December 5, 2022*; 7:00 p.m., BTN | | at Michigan State | W 76–71 | 8–1 (1–0) | Breslin Center (3,015); East Lansing, MI |
| December 8, 2022*; 6:30 p.m., BTN | | No. 20 Maryland | L 74–77 | 8–2 (1–1) | Mackey Arena (3,007); West Lafayette, IN |
| December 11, 2022*; 2:00 p.m. | | Illinois State | W 64–51 | 9–2 | Mackey Arena (3,429); West Lafayette, IN |
| December 21, 2022*; 2:00 p.m. | | at Texas A&M | W 59–53 | 10–2 | Reed Arena (1,608); College Station, TX |
| December 29, 2022; 9:00 p.m., BTN | | at No. 12 Iowa | L 68–83 | 10–3 (1–2) | Carver–Hawkeye Arena (11,942); Iowa City, IA |
| January 1, 2023; 12:00 p.m., BTN | | Wisconsin | W 73–61 | 11–3 (2–2) | Mackey Arena (3,552); West Lafayette, IN |
| January 7, 2023; 2:00 p.m. | | at Penn State | L 60–70 | 11–4 (2–3) | Bryce Jordan Center (2,367); University Park, PA |
| January 10, 2023; 6:30 p.m., BTN | | No. 17 Michigan | L 59–80 | 11–5 (2–4) | Mackey Arena (3,473); West Lafayette, IN |
| January 14, 2023; 3:00 p.m. | | at Northwestern | W 65–54 | 12–5 (3–4) | Welsh–Ryan Arena (3,473); Evanston, IL |
| January 18, 2023; 7:00 p.m. | | Nebraska | L 64–71 | 12–6 (3–5) | Mackey Arena (3,473); West Lafayette, IN |
| January 21, 2023; 3:00 p.m. | | Minnesota | W 75–56 | 13–6 (4–5) | Mackey Arena (5,003); West Lafayette, IN |
| January 26, 2023; 8:00 p.m. | | at No. 22 Illinois | W 62–52 | 14–6 (5–5) | State Farm Center (2,584); Champaign, IL |
| January 29, 2023; 1:00 p.m. | | at No. 2 Ohio State | W 73–65 | 15–6 (6–5) | Value City Arena (8,664); Columbus, OH |
| February 5, 2023; 2:00 p.m., FS1 | | No. 4 Indiana; Rivalry | L 46–69 | 15–7 (6–6) | Mackey Arena (14,876); West Lafayette, IN |
| February 9, 2023; 7:00 p.m. | | at Rutgers | W 68–54 | 16–7 (7–6) | Jersey Mike's Arena (1,149); Piscataway, NJ |
| February 12, 2023; 2:00 p.m. | | Northwestern | W 76–61 | 17–7 (8–6) | Mackey Arena (3,831); West Lafayette, IN |
| February 15, 2022; 7:00 p.m. | | Michigan State | Postponed | | Mackey Arena; West Lafayette, IN |
| February 19, 2023; 12:00 p.m., BTN | | at No. 2 Indiana; Rivalry | L 60–83 | 17–8 (8–7) | Simon Skjodt Assembly Hall (17,222); Bloomington, IN |
| February 22, 2023; 7:00 p.m. | | Penn State | W 86–62 | 18–8 (9–7) | Mackey Arena (3,403); West Lafayette, IN |
| February 26, 2023; 3:00 p.m. | | at Minnesota | L 69–77 | 18–9 (9–8) | Williams Arena (4,014); Minneapolis, MN |
Big Ten Women's Tournament
| March 2, 2023; 6:30 p.m., BTN | (7) | vs. (10) Wisconsin; Second round | W 57–55 | 19–9 | Target Center (5,124); Minneapolis, MN |
| March 3, 2023; 6:30 p.m., BTN | (7) | vs. (2) No. 7 Iowa; Quarterfinal | L 58–69 | 19–10 | Target Center; Minneapolis, MN |
NCAA Women's Tournament
| March 16, 2023*; 7:00 p.m., ESPN2 | (11 S3) | vs. (11 S3) St. John's; First four | L 64–66 | 19–11 | Value City Arena (6,828); Columbus, OH |
*Non-conference game. ^{#}Rankings from AP Poll. (#) Tournament seedings in parentheses. S3=Seattle 3. All times are in Eastern Time.

== Rankings ==
Ranking movements Legend: ██ Increase in ranking ██ Decrease in ranking — = Not ranked RV = Received votes
| | Week | | | | | | | | | | | | | | | | | | | | |
| Poll | Pre | 1 | 2 | 3 | 4 | 5 | 6 | 7 | 8 | 9 | 10 | 11 | 12 | 13 | 14 | 15 | 16 | 17 | 18 | 19 | Final |
|---|---|---|---|---|---|---|---|---|---|---|---|---|---|---|---|---|---|---|---|---|---|
| AP | — | —* | — | — | — | RV | — | — | — | — | — | — | — | RV | — | — | — | | | | Not released |
| Coaches | — | —* | —^ | — | — | — | — | — | — | — | — | — | — | RV | RV | RV | — | | | | |

*The preseason and week 1 polls were the same.
^Coaches did not release a week 2 poll.
