= 2022–23 Wisconsin Badgers women's basketball team =

American college basketball season

2022–23 Wisconsin Badgers women's basketball
- Conference: Big Ten Conference
- Record: 11–20 (6–12 Big Ten)
- Head coach: Marisa Moseley (2nd season)
- Associate head coach: Scott Merritt; Kate Baronsky
- Assistant coach: Caroline Doty
- Home arena: Kohl Center

2022–23 Big Ten women's basketball standings
	Conf.				Overall
Team	W		L	PCT	W		L	PCT
No. 2 Indiana	16	–	2	.889	28	–	4	.875
No. 3 Iowa †	15	–	3	.833	31	–	7	.816
No. 7 Maryland	15	–	3	.833	28	–	7	.800
No. 12 Ohio State	12	–	6	.667	28	–	8	.778
No. 18 Michigan	11	–	7	.611	23	–	10	.697
Illinois	11	–	7	.611	22	–	10	.688
Purdue	9	–	8	.529	19	–	11	.633
Nebraska	8	–	10	.444	18	–	15	.545
Michigan State	7	–	10	.412	16	–	14	.533
Wisconsin	6	–	12	.333	11	–	20	.355
Rutgers	5	–	13	.278	12	–	20	.375
Minnesota	4	–	14	.222	11	–	19	.367
Penn State	4	–	14	.222	14	–	17	.452
Northwestern	2	–	16	.111	9	–	21	.300
† 2023 Big Ten tournament winner As of April 2, 2023; Rankings from AP poll

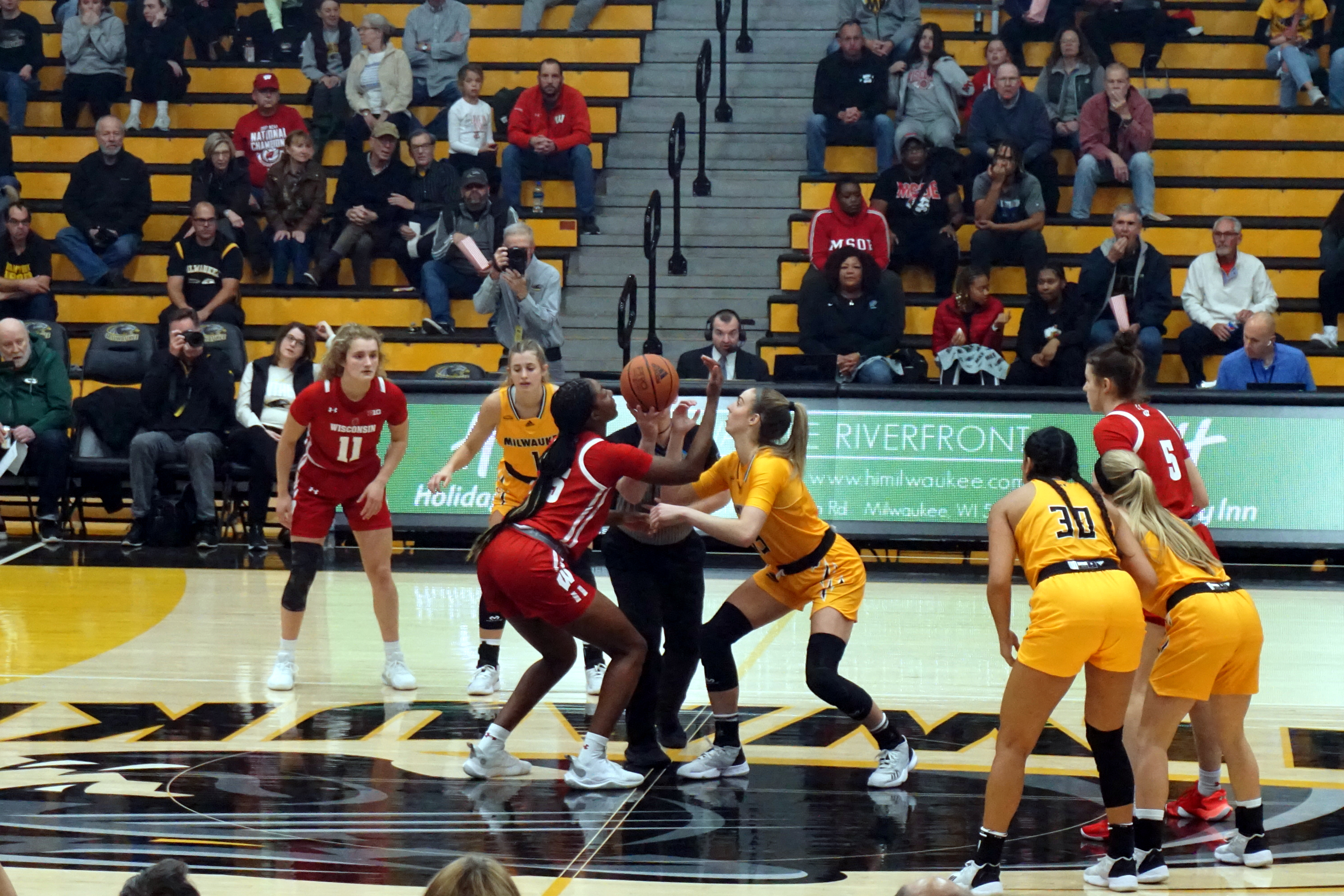
Wisconsin in action at Milwaukee

The 2022–23 Wisconsin Badgers women's basketball team represented the University of Wisconsin–Madison in the 2022–23 college basketball season. Led by second year head coach Marisa Moseley, the team played their games at Kohl Center and are members of the Big Ten Conference.

== Schedule and results ==
Date time, TV	Rank^{#}	Opponent^{#}	Result	Record	Site (attendance) city, state
Exhibition
October 30, 2022*; 5:00 p.m., BTN+		Wisconsin–La Crosse	W 94–41		Kohl Center (2,712); Madison, WI
Regular season
November 7, 2022*; 7:30 p.m., ESPN+		at Milwaukee	W 58–49	1–0	Klotsche Center (2,046); Milwaukee, WI
November 11, 2022*; 3:30 p.m., BTN		Kansas State	L 63–77	1–1	American Family Field; Milwaukee, WI
November 13, 2022*; 1:00 p.m., BTN+		North Florida	W 77–54	2–1	Kohl Center (3,253); Madison, WI
November 16, 2022*; 6:30 p.m., BTN+		Bradley	W 103–49	3–1	Kohl Center (2,223); Madison, WI
November 20, 2022*; 2:00 p.m., ESPN+		at Illinois State	L 57–62	3–2	Redbird Arena (1,108); Normal, IL
November 24, 2022*; 12:00 p.m., ESPN3		vs. Georgia; Paradise Jam	L 60–68	3–3	Sports and Fitness Center; Saint Thomas, USVI
November 25, 2022*; 12:00 p.m., ESPN3		vs. Seton Hall; Paradise Jam	L 72–83	3–4	Sports and Fitness Center; Saint Thomas, USVI
November 26, 2022*; 12:00 p.m., ESPN3		at VCU; Paradise Jam	L 67–75	3–5	Sports and Fitness Center; Saint Thomas, USVI
December 1, 2022*; 6:30 p.m.		Florida State; ACC–Big Ten Women's Challenge	L 87–92	3–6	Kohl Center (3,035); Madison, WI
December 4, 2022; 1:00 p.m., BTN+		No. 10 Iowa	L 71–102	3–7 (0–1)	Kohl Center (3,926); Madison, WI
December 7, 2022; 7:00 p.m., BTN+		at Nebraska	L 54–82	3–8 (0–2)	Pinnacle Bank Arena (4,553); Lincoln, NE
December 11, 2022*; 1:00 p.m.		St. Thomas	W 72–64	4–8	Kohl Center (3,483); Madison, WI
December 14, 2022*; 7:00 p.m., ESPN+		at Green Bay	L 60–70	4–9	Kress Events Center (2,390); Green Bay, WI
December 29, 2022; 6:30 p.m., BTN+		Illinois	L 63–79	4–10 (0–3)	Kohl Center (3,274); Madison, WI
January 1, 2023; 12:00 p.m., BTN		at Purdue	L 61–73	4–11 (0–4)	Mackey Arena (3,552); West Lafayette, INJ
January 8, 2023; 3:00 p.m., BTN+		Minnesota	W 81–77	5–11 (1–4)	Kohl Center (3,445); Madison, WI
January 11, 2023; 6:00 p.m., BTN+		at Michigan State	W 84–80	6–11 (2–4)	Breslin Student Events Center (2,676); East Lansing, MI
January 15, 2023; 1:00 p.m., BTN+		at No. 6 Indiana	L 56–93	6–12 (2–5)	Simon Skjodt Assembly Hall (10,422); Bloomington, IN
January 19, 2023; 6:30 p.m., BTN+		No. 11 Maryland	L 64–77	6–13 (2–6)	Kohl Center (2,746); Madison, WI
January 22, 2023; TBD, BTN		at Penn State	L 69–74	6–14 (2–7)	Bryce Jordan Center (2,310); University Park, PA
January 25, 2023*; 6:30 p.m.		Valparaiso; Rescheduled from December 22	W 59–44	7–14	Kohl Center (2,496); Madison, WI
January 29, 2023; 1:00 p.m., BTN+		Northwestern	L 67–70	7–15 (2–8)	Kohl Center (8,217); Madison, WI
February 1, 2023; 6:30 p.m., BTN+		No. 10 Ohio State	L 67–90	7–16 (2–9)	Kohl Center (2,890); Madison, WI
February 5, 2023; 1:00 p.m., BTN+		at Rutgers	L 67–73	7–17 (2–10)	Jersey Mike's Arena (5,662); Piscataway, NJ
February 8, 2023; 6:30 p.m., BTN+		Michigan State	L 63–88	7–18 (2–11)	Kohl Center (4,254); Madison, WI
February 11, 2023; 3:00 p.m., BTN+		at Minnesota	W 76–70	8–18 (3–11)	Williams Arena (4,538); Minneapolis, MN
February 15, 2023; 6:30 p.m., BTN+		at No. 7 Iowa	L 61–91	8–19 (3–12)	Carver–Hawkeye Arena (10,512); Iowa City, IA
February 20, 2023; 7:00 p.m., BTN		Rutgers	W 88–62	9–19 (4–12)	Kohl Center (3,201); Madison, WI
February 23, 2023; 6:00 p.m., BTN		at Northwestern	W 64–57	10–19 (5–12)	Welsh–Ryan Arena (2,077); Evanston, IL
February 26, 2023; 1:00 p.m., BTN+		No. 12 Michigan	W 78–70	11–19 (6–12)	Kohl Center (4,933); Madison, WI
Big Ten Women's Tournament
March 2, 2023; 5:30 p.m., BTN	(10)	vs. (7) Purdue; Second round	L 55–57	11–20	Target Center (5,124); Minneapolis, MN
*Non-conference game. ^{#}Rankings from AP Poll. (#) Tournament seedings in parentheses. All times are in Central.

== See also ==
- 2022–23 Wisconsin Badgers men's basketball team
