= 2022–23 Illinois Fighting Illini women's basketball team =

Intercollegiate basketball season

2022–23 Illinois Fighting Illini women's basketball

NCAA Tournament, First Four
- Conference: Big Ten Conference
- Record: 22–10 (11–7 Big Ten)
- Head coach: Shauna Green (1st season)
- Associate head coach: Calamity McEntire
- Assistant coaches: DeAntoine Beasley; Ryan Gensler
- Home arena: State Farm Center

2022–23 Big Ten women's basketball standings
	Conf.				Overall
Team	W		L	PCT	W		L	PCT
No. 2 Indiana	16	–	2	.889	28	–	4	.875
No. 3 Iowa †	15	–	3	.833	31	–	7	.816
No. 7 Maryland	15	–	3	.833	28	–	7	.800
No. 12 Ohio State	12	–	6	.667	28	–	8	.778
No. 18 Michigan	11	–	7	.611	23	–	10	.697
Illinois	11	–	7	.611	22	–	10	.688
Purdue	9	–	8	.529	19	–	11	.633
Nebraska	8	–	10	.444	18	–	15	.545
Michigan State	7	–	10	.412	16	–	14	.533
Wisconsin	6	–	12	.333	11	–	20	.355
Rutgers	5	–	13	.278	12	–	20	.375
Minnesota	4	–	14	.222	11	–	19	.367
Penn State	4	–	14	.222	14	–	17	.452
Northwestern	2	–	16	.111	9	–	21	.300
† 2023 Big Ten tournament winner As of April 2, 2023; Rankings from AP poll

The 2022–23 Illinois Fighting Illini women's basketball team represented the University of Illinois during the 2022–23 NCAA Division I women's basketball season. The Fighting Illini were led by first-year head coach Shauna Green, and they played their home games at State Farm Center. This season marked the program's 41st season as a member of the Big Ten Conference.

== Previous season ==
The Illini finished the 2021–22 season 7–20 overall, with a 1–13 record in Big Ten play to finish in last place. As the fourteenth seed in the Big Ten women's tournament, they defeated eleventh seed Wisconsin in the first round before losing to sixth seed Nebraska in the second round. They were not invited to participate in any post-season tournaments.

== Offseason ==
After five seasons as Illinois head coach, Nancy Fahey announced her retirement on March 4, 2022.

On March 21, 2022, Green was named as the program's tenth head coach, having had six successful seasons as the head coach at Dayton. All three of Green's assistant coaching hires at Illinois (Calamity McEntire, DeAntoine Beasley and Ryan Gensler) had previously worked for her at Dayton. The roster included five players from Fahey's final Illinois team, four freshmen, and four transfers, including two from Dayton (Makira Cook and Brynn Shoup-Hill). Genesis Bryant transferred from North Carolina State, but she had been recruited by Green for Dayton before committing to the Wolfpack.

== Roster ==
2022–23 Illinois Fighting Illini women's basketball team
Players
Coaches

Pos.	#	Name	Height	Year	Previous school	Hometown
G	0	Camille Jackson	5 ft 11 in (1.8 m)	Fr	Butler College Prep	Chicago, IL
G	1	Genesis Bryant	5 ft 6 in (1.68 m)	Jr	North Carolina State	Jonesboro, GA
G	3	Makira Cook	5 ft 6 in (1.68 m)	Jr	Dayton	Cincinnati, OH
G	4	Kam'Ren Rhodes	5 ft 6 in (1.68 m)	Fr	Arizona Compass Prep	Chandler, AZ
G	11	Jada Peebles	5 ft 10 in (1.78 m)	Sr	Wakefield	Raleigh, NC
G	12	Jayla Oden	5 ft 9 in (1.75 m)	So	McDonogh	Baltimore, MD
C	13	Liisa Taponen	6 ft 5 in (1.96 m)	Fr	Mäkelänrinteen Upper Secondary School	Tampere, Finland
F/C	14	Geovana Lopes	6 ft 3 in (1.91 m)	GS	Odessa College	Bataguassu, Brazil
C	21	Aicha Ndour	6 ft 6 in (1.98 m)	Jr	Northwest Florida State College	Somone, Senegal
F	23	Brynn Shoup-Hill	6 ft 3 in (1.91 m)	So	Dayton	Goshen, IN
G	24	Adalia McKenzie	5 ft 10 in (1.78 m)	So	Park Center	Brooklyn Park, MN
F	33	Samantha Dewey	6 ft 2 in (1.88 m)	Fr	Brooks School	North Andover, MA
F	44	Kendall Bostic	6 ft 2 in (1.88 m)	Jr	Michigan State	Kokomo, IN

Head coach

- Shauna Green (Canisius)

Assistant coach(es)

- Calamity McEntire (Eastern Oklahoma State)
- DeAntoine Beasley (Tennessee Tech)
- Ryan Gensler (Saint Joseph's)

Legend

- (C) Team captain
- (S) Suspended
- (I) Ineligible
- (W) Walk-on
- Injured
- Current redshirt

Roster

== Schedule and results ==
Date time, TV	Rank^{#}	Opponent^{#}	Result	Record	Site (attendance) city, state
Exhibition
November 4, 2022*; 7:00 p.m., BTN+		Quincy	W 78–43	–	State Farm Center (1,813); Champaign, IL
Regular season
November 9, 2022*; 7:00 p.m., BTN+		LIU	W 75–40	1–0	State Farm Center (1,583); Champaign, IL
November 13, 2022*; 2:00 p.m., BTN+		Alcorn State	W 90–59	2–0	State Farm Center (1,776); Champaign, IL
November 16, 2022*; 11:00 a.m., BTN+		McNeese State	W 100–38	3–0	State Farm Center (8,141); Champaign, IL
November 19, 2022*; 2:00 p.m., BTN+		Evansville	W 93–54	4–0	State Farm Center (1,409); Champaign, IL
November 21, 2022*; 7:00 p.m., BTN+		Oakland	W 84–55	5–0	State Farm Center (1,334); Champaign, IL
November 25, 2022*; 4:45 p.m., FloHoops		vs. Charlotte; Daytona Beach Invitational	W 70–43	6–0	Ocean Center (250); Daytona, FL
November 26, 2022*; 2:30 p.m., FloHoops		vs. Delaware; Daytona Beach Invitational	L 80–83	6–1	Ocean Center (325); Daytona, FL
November 30, 2022*; 4:00 p.m., ACCN		at Pittsburgh; ACC–Big Ten Challenge	W 92–71	7–1	Petersen Events Center (274); Pittsburgh, PA
December 4, 2022; 1:00 p.m., BTN+		at No. 5 Indiana	L 61–65	7–2 (0–1)	Simon Skjodt Assembly Hall (5,381); Bloomington, IN
December 7, 2022; 7:00 p.m., BTN+		Rutgers	W 80–62	8–2 (1–1)	State Farm Center (1,771); Champaign, IL
December 11, 2022*; 1:00 p.m., FloHoops		at Butler	W 65–63	9–2 (1–1)	Hinkle Fieldhouse (851); Indianapolis, IN
December 18, 2022*; 4:00 p.m., SECN		at Missouri; Braggin' Rights	W 76–66	10–2 (1–1)	Mizzou Arena (2,963); Columbia, MO
December 21, 2022*; 12:00 p.m., BTN+		Florida Atlantic	W 81–46	11–2 (1–1)	State Farm Center (1,932); Champaign, IL
December 29, 2022; 6:30 p.m., BTN+		at Wisconsin	W 79–63	12–2 (2–1)	Kohl Center (3,274); Madison, WI
January 1, 2023; 2:00 p.m., BTN		No. 12 Iowa	W 90–86	13–2 (3–1)	State Farm Center (4,803); Champaign, IL
January 5, 2023; 8:00 p.m., BTN		Northwestern	W 85–79	14–2 (4–1)	State Farm Center (1,904); Champaign, IL
January 8, 2023; 12:00 p.m., BTN+		at No. 3 Ohio State	L 81-87	14–3 (4–2)	Value City Arena (6,273); Columbus, OH
January 15, 2023; 2:00 p.m., BTN+	No. 24	at Minnesota	W 70–57	15–3 (5–2)	Williams Arena (4,454); Minneapolis, MN
January 18, 2023; 7:00 p.m., BTN+	No. 21	No. 6 Indiana	L 72–83	15–4 (5–3)	State Farm Center (5,583); Champaign, IL
January 22, 2023; 2:00 p.m., BTN+	No. 21	at Northwestern	W 67–64	16–4 (6–3)	Welsh–Ryan Arena (2,276); Evanston, IL
January 26, 2023; 7:00 p.m., BTN+	No. 22	Purdue	L 52–62	16–5 (6–4)	State Farm Center (2,584); Champaign, IL
January 29, 2023; 5:00 p.m., BTN	No. 22	Michigan State	W 86–76	17–5 (7–4)	State Farm Center (5,096); Champaign, IL
February 2, 2023; 5:30 p.m., BTN		at No. 18 Michigan	L 57–74	17–6 (7–5)	Crisler Center (2,676); Ann Arbor, MI
February 5, 2023; 2:00 p.m., BTN+		Minnesota	W 69–62	18–6 (8–5)	State Farm Center (4,533); Champaign, IL
February 9, 2023; 7:00 p.m., BTN+		at Nebraska	W 72–64	19–6 (9–5)	Pinnacle Bank Arena (4,369); Lincoln, NE
February 12, 2023; 12:00 p.m., BTN+		at No. 8 Maryland	L 71–82	19–7 (9–6)	Xfinity Center (7,301); College Park, MD
February 19, 2023; 2:00 p.m., BTN+		Penn State	W 85–62	20–7 (10–6)	State Farm Center (6,299); Champaign, IL
February 22, 2023; 7:00 p.m., BTN+	No. 25т	Nebraska	L 57–90	20–8 (10–7)	State Farm Center (3,547); Champaign, IL
February 26, 2023; 1:00 p.m., BTN+	No. 25т	at Rutgers	W 75–53	21–8 (11–7)	Jersey Mike's Arena (2,049); Piscataway, NJ
Big Ten Women's Tournament
March 2, 2023; 8 p.m., BTN	(6)	vs. (11) Rutgers; Second round	W 81–55	22–8	Target Center (5,124); Minneapolis, MN
March 3, 2023; 8 p.m., BTN	(6)	vs. (3) No. 5 Maryland; Quarterfinals	L 58–73	22–9	Target Center (8,577); Minneapolis, MN
NCAA Tournament
March 15, 2023*; 6:00 p.m., ESPNU	(11 G1)	vs. (11 G1) Mississippi State; First Four	L 56–70	22–10	Edmund P. Joyce Center (466); South Bend, IN
*Non-conference game. ^{#}Rankings from AP Poll. (#) Tournament seedings in parentheses. G1=Greenville 1. All times are in Central Time. Source:

== Rankings ==
Ranking movements Legend: ██ Increase in ranking ██ Decrease in ranking — = Not ranked RV = Received votes т = Tied with team above or below
	Week																				
Poll	Pre	1	2	3	4	5	6	7	8	9	10	11	12	13	14	15	16	17	18	19	Final
AP	—	—	—	—	—	—	—	—	—	RV	24	21	22	RV	RV	RV	25т	RV	—	—	
Coaches	—	—	—	—	—	—	—	—	RV	RV	24	23	22	24	RV	RV	RV	—	—	—	

== See also ==
- 2022–23 Illinois Fighting Illini men's basketball team
