= 2022–23 Michigan State Spartans women's basketball team =

Intercollegiate basketball season

2022–23 Michigan State Spartans women's basketball
- Conference: Big Ten Conference
- Record: 16–14 (7–10 Big Ten)
- Head coach: Suzy Merchant (16th season)
- Assistant coaches: Dean Lockwood; Maria Fantanarosa; Kristin Haynie
- Home arena: Breslin Center

2022–23 Big Ten women's basketball standings
	Conf.				Overall
Team	W		L	PCT	W		L	PCT
No. 2 Indiana	16	–	2	.889	28	–	4	.875
No. 3 Iowa †	15	–	3	.833	31	–	7	.816
No. 7 Maryland	15	–	3	.833	28	–	7	.800
No. 12 Ohio State	12	–	6	.667	28	–	8	.778
No. 18 Michigan	11	–	7	.611	23	–	10	.697
Illinois	11	–	7	.611	22	–	10	.688
Purdue	9	–	8	.529	19	–	11	.633
Nebraska	8	–	10	.444	18	–	15	.545
Michigan State	7	–	10	.412	16	–	14	.533
Wisconsin	6	–	12	.333	11	–	20	.355
Rutgers	5	–	13	.278	12	–	20	.375
Minnesota	4	–	14	.222	11	–	19	.367
Penn State	4	–	14	.222	14	–	17	.452
Northwestern	2	–	16	.111	9	–	21	.300
† 2023 Big Ten tournament winner As of April 2, 2023; Rankings from AP poll

The 2022–23 Michigan State Spartans women's basketball team represented Michigan State University as a member of the Big Ten Conference during the 2022–23 NCAA Division I women's basketball season. The Spartans, led by 16th-year head coach Suzy Merchant played their home games at Breslin Center in East Lansing, Michigan. They finished the season 16–14, 7–10 in Big Ten play to finish in ninth place. They defeated Nebraska in the second round of the Big Ten tournament before losing to Indiana. The Spartans were invited to the National Invitation Tournament, but declined the invitation due in part to the Michigan State shooting on campus.

On January 28, 2023, head coach Suzy Merchant was involved in an automobile crash which led to her being hospitalized. Assistant coach Dean Lockwood took over as the acting head coach for the remainder of the season. Merchant stepped as head coach after the conclusion of the season. On March 31, the school named Bowling Green head coach Robyn Fralick the team's new head coach.

The team's statistical leaders included Kamaria McDaniel with 427 points scored, DeeDee Hagemann with 146 assists, and Taiyier Parks with 152 rebounds.

== Previous season ==
The Spartans finished the 2021–22 season 15–15, 8–9 in Big Ten play to finish in eighth place. In the Big Ten tournament they defeated Purdue in the before losing to Ohio State in the quarterfinals.

== Schedule and results ==
Date time, TV	Rank^{#}	Opponent^{#}	Result	Record	Site (attendance) city, state
Exhibition
October 30, 2022*; 3:00 p.m., BTN+		Saginaw Valley State	W 90–56	–	Breslin Center; East Lansing, MI
Regular season
November 7, 2022*; Noon, BTN+		Delaware State	W 86–37	1–0	Breslin Center (5,462); East Lansing, MI
November 10, 2022*; 7:00 p.m., BTN+		Purdue Fort Wayne	W 85–53	2–0	Breslin Center (2,314); East Lansing, MI
November 13, 2022*; 3:00 p.m., BTN+		Western Michigan	W 97–49	3–0	Breslin Center (3,326); East Lansing, MI
November 15, 2022*; 7:00 p.m., BTN+		Oakland	W 85–39	4–0	Breslin Center (2,199); East Lansing, MI
November 17, 2022*; 7:00 p.m., BTN+		Florida A&M	W 109–44	5–0	Breslin Center (2,145); East Lansing, MI
November 19, 2022*; 1:00 p.m., ESPN+		at Central Michigan	W 84–54	6–0	McGuirk Arena (1,460); Mount Pleasant, MI
November 24, 2022*; 7:30 p.m., ESPNU		vs. No. 5 Iowa State; Phil Knight Invitational semifinals	L 49–80	6–1	Chiles Center (1,219); Portland, OR
November 27, 2022*; 1:00 p.m., ESPN2		vs. No. 18 Oregon; Phil Knight Invitational 3rd place game	L 78–86	6–2	Veterans Memorial Coliseum (3,938); Portland, OR
December 1, 2022*; 8:00 p.m., BTN		Georgia Tech; ACC–Big Ten Women's Challenge	L 63–66	6–3	Breslin Center (2,748); East Lansing, MI
December 5, 2022; 7:00 p.m., BTN		Purdue	L 71–76	6–4 (0–1)	Breslin Center (3,015); East Lansing, MI
December 11, 2022; 4:00 p.m., BTN		at No. 3 Ohio State	L 68–74	6–5 (0–2)	Value City Arena (6,979); Columbus, OH
December 18, 2022*; 3:00 p.m., BTN+		Detroit Mercy	W 91–41	7–5	Breslin Center (3,240); East Lansing, MI
December 20, 2022*; 7:00 p.m., BTN+		Prairie View A&M	W 98–50	8–5	Breslin Center (2,495); East Lansing, MI
December 29, 2022; 3:00 p.m., BTN+		No. 4 Indiana	W 83–78	9–5 (1–2)	Breslin Center (4,533); East Lansing, MI
January 2, 2023; 8:00 p.m., BTN+		at Northwestern	W 71–64	10–5 (2–2)	Welsh–Ryan Arena (1,282); Evanston, IL
January 7, 2023; 1:00 p.m., BTN+		at No. 13 Maryland	L 85–94	10–6 (2–3)	Xfinity Center (6,494); College Park, MD
January 11, 2023; 7:00 p.m., BTN+		Wisconsin	L 80–84 ^{OT}	10–7 (2–4)	Breslin Center (2,672); East Lansing, MI
January 14, 2023; 1:00 p.m., BTN+		at No. 17 Michigan; Rivalry	L 55–70	10–8 (2–5)	Crisler Center (10,534); Ann Arbor, MI
January 18, 2023; 7:00 p.m., BTN+		No. 10 Iowa	L 81–84 ^{OT}	10–9 (2–6)	Breslin Center (3,359); East Lansing, MI
January 22, 2023; 3:00 p.m., BTN+		Rutgers	W 85–63	11–9 (3–6)	Breslin Center (5,015); East Lansing, MI
January 29, 2023; 6:00 p.m., BTN		at No. 22 Illinois	L 76–86	11–10 (3–7)	State Farm Center (5,096); Champaign, IL
February 2, 2023; 8:30 p.m., BTN		at Nebraska	L 67–71	11–11 (3–8)	Pinnacle Bank Arena (4,549); Lincoln, NE
February 5, 2023; 3:00 p.m., BTN+		No. 18 Michigan; Rivalry	L 67–77	11–12 (3–9)	Breslin Center (9,220); East Lansing, MI
February 8, 2023; 7:30 p.m., BTN+		at Wisconsin	W 88–63	12–12 (4–9)	Kohl Center (4,254); Madison, WI
February 12, 2023; 3:00 p.m., BTN+		Penn State	W 81–75	13–12 (5–9)	Breslin Center (5,335); East Lansing, MI
February 15, 2023; 7:00 p.m., BTN+		at Purdue	Canceled due to Mass Shooting at Michigan State		Mackey Arena; West Lafayette, IN
February 18, 2023; 3:00 p.m., BTN+		No. 8 Maryland	L 61–66	13–13 (5–10)	Breslin Center (3,439); East Lansing, MI
February 22, 2023; 4:00 p.m., BTN+		Minnesota	W 71–67	14–13 (6–10)	Breslin Center (2,392); East Lansing, MI
February 25, 2023; 2:00 p.m., BTN+		at Penn State	W 80–65	15–13 (7–10)	Bryce Jordan Center (4,394); State College, PA
Big Ten tournament
March 2, 2023; 12:30 pm, BTN	(9)	vs. (8) Nebraska; Second round	W 67–64	16–13	Target Center (4,908); Minneapolis, MN
March 3, 2023; 12:30 p.m., BTN	(9)	vs. (1) No. 2 Indiana; Quarterfinals	L 85–94	16–14	Target Center (5,544); Minneapolis, MN
*Non-conference game. ^{#}Rankings from AP Poll. (#) Tournament seedings in parentheses. All times are in Eastern Time.
