= 2022–23 Nebraska Cornhuskers women's basketball team =

American college basketball season

2022–23 Nebraska Cornhuskers women's basketball

WNIT, Super 16
- Conference: Big Ten Conference
- Record: 18–15 (8–10 Big Ten)
- Head coach: Amy Williams (7th season)
- Assistant coaches: Tom Goehle; Tandem Mays; Jessica Keller
- Home arena: Pinnacle Bank Arena

2022–23 Big Ten women's basketball standings
	Conf.				Overall
Team	W		L	PCT	W		L	PCT
No. 2 Indiana	16	–	2	.889	28	–	4	.875
No. 3 Iowa †	15	–	3	.833	31	–	7	.816
No. 7 Maryland	15	–	3	.833	28	–	7	.800
No. 12 Ohio State	12	–	6	.667	28	–	8	.778
No. 18 Michigan	11	–	7	.611	23	–	10	.697
Illinois	11	–	7	.611	22	–	10	.688
Purdue	9	–	8	.529	19	–	11	.633
Nebraska	8	–	10	.444	18	–	15	.545
Michigan State	7	–	10	.412	16	–	14	.533
Wisconsin	6	–	12	.333	11	–	20	.355
Rutgers	5	–	13	.278	12	–	20	.375
Minnesota	4	–	14	.222	11	–	19	.367
Penn State	4	–	14	.222	14	–	17	.452
Northwestern	2	–	16	.111	9	–	21	.300
† 2023 Big Ten tournament winner As of April 2, 2023; Rankings from AP poll

The 2022–23 Nebraska Cornhuskers women's basketball team represented the University of Nebraska in the 2022–23 college basketball season. Led by seventh year head coach Amy Williams, the team played their games at the Pinnacle Bank Arena and are members of the Big Ten Conference.

== Schedule and results ==
Date time, TV	Rank^{#}	Opponent^{#}	Result	Record	Site (attendance) city, state
Exhibition
October 30, 2022*; 1:00 p.m., BTN+	No. 22	Washburn	W 70–27		Pinnacle Bank Arena (4,126); Lincoln, NE
Regular season
November 7, 2022*; 12:00 p.m., BTN+	No. 22	Omaha	W 100–36	1–0	Pinnacle Bank Arena (6,233); Lincoln, NE
November 11, 2022*; 8:00 p.m., BTN+	No. 22	Houston Christian	W 79–48	2–0	Pinnacle Bank Arena (4,264); Lincoln, NE
November 15, 2022*; 6:00 p.m.	No. 22	at No. 20 Creighton	L 51–77	2–1	D. J. Sokol Arena (2,306); Omaha, NE
November 19, 2022*; 2:00 p.m., ESPN+	No. 22	at Drake	L 62–80	2–2	Knapp Center (2,487); Des Moines, IA
November 22, 2022*; 6:00 p.m., BTN+		Tarleton State	W 71–53	3–2	Pinnacle Bank Arena (4,331); Lincoln, NE
November 25, 2022*; 12:30 p.m.		vs. Texas A&M–Corpus Christi; Puerto Rico Clasico	W 73–44	4–2	Roberto Clemente Coliseum (100); San Juan, PR
November 26, 2022*; 12:30 p.m.		vs. Mississippi State; Puerto Rico Clasico	W 73–65 ^{OT}	5–2	Roberto Clemente Coliseum (100); San Juan, PR
December 1, 2022*; 6:00 p.m., ACCN		at No. 9 Virginia Tech; ACC–Big Ten Women's Challenge	L 54–85	5–3	Cassell Coliseum (2,651); Blacksburg, VA
December 4, 2022; 12:00 p.m., BTN+		at No. 20 Maryland	W 90–67	6–3 (1–0)	Xfinity Center (4,321); College Park, MD
December 7, 2022; 7:00 p.m., BTN+		Wisconsin	W 82–54	7–3 (2–0)	Pinnacle Bank Arena (4,553); Lincoln, NE
December 10, 2022*; 6:00 p.m., BTN+		Samford	W 71–46	8–3	Pinnacle Bank Arena (4,645); Lincoln, NE
December 18, 2022*; 2:00 p.m., BTN+		Wyoming	W 66–39	9–3	Pinnacle Bank Arena (4,972); Lincoln, NE
December 21, 2022*; 6:00 p.m., BTN+		No. 20 Kansas	W 85–79 ^{3OT}	10–3	Pinnacle Bank Arena (4,637); Lincoln, NE
December 28, 2022; 6:00 p.m., BTN+		No. 14 Michigan	L 59–76	10–4 (2–1)	Pinnacle Bank Arena (8,150); Lincoln, NE
January 1, 2023; 12:00 p.m., ESPN2		at No. 4 Indiana	L 62–74 ^{OT}	10–5 (2–2)	Simon Skjodt Assembly Hall (7,152); Bloomington, IN
January 7, 2023; 1:00 p.m., BTN		at Rutgers	L 45–57	10–6 (2–3)	Jersey Mike's Arena (3,223); Piscataway, NJ
January 11, 2023; 7:00 p.m., BTN+		Penn State	W 80–51	11–6 (3–3)	Pinnacle Bank Arena (3,082); Lincoln, NE
January 14, 2023; 1:30 p.m., BTN		No. 3 Ohio State	L 67–76	11–7 (3–4)	Pinnacle Bank Arena (5,879); Lincoln, NE
January 18, 2023; 6:00 p.m., BTN+		at Purdue	W 71–64	12–7 (4–4)	Mackey Arena (2,796); West Lafayette, IN
January 22, 2023; 2:00 p.m., BTN+		No. 11 Maryland	L 54–69	12–8 (4–5)	Pinnacle Bank Arena (5,715); Lincoln, NE
January 28, 2023; 12:00 p.m., FOX		at No. 10 Iowa	L 76–80	12–9 (4–6)	Carver–Hawkeye Arena (13,843); Iowa City, IA
February 2, 2023; 7:30 p.m., BTN		Michigan State	W 71–67	13–9 (5–6)	Pinnacle Bank Arena (4,549); Lincoln, NE
February 6, 2023; 6:00 p.m., BTN		at Northwestern	W 78–66	14–9 (6–6)	Welsh–Ryan Arena (1,459); Evanston, IL
February 9, 2023; 7:00 p.m., BTN+		Illinois	L 64–72	14–10 (6–7)	Pinnacle Bank Arena (4,369); Lincoln, NE
February 12, 2023; 12:00 p.m., BTN+		at No. 12 Michigan	L 75–80	14–11 (6–8)	Crisler Center (4,313); Ann Arbor, MI
February 15, 2023; 7:00 p.m., BTN+		at Minnesota	L 92–95	14–12 (6–9)	Williams Arena (3,268); Minneapolis, MN
February 18, 2023; 1:00 p.m., BTN		No. 7 Iowa	L 60–80	14–13 (6–10)	Pinnacle Bank Arena (14,289); Lincoln, NE
February 22, 2023; 7:00 p.m., BTN+		at No. 25 Illinois	W 90–57	15–13 (7–10)	State Farm Center (3,547); Champaign, IL
February 26, 2023; 1:00 p.m., BTN+		Northwestern	W 80–64	16–13 (8–10)	Pinnacle Bank Arena (6,232); Lincoln, NE
Big Ten Tournament
March 2, 2023; 11:30 pm, BTN	(8)	vs. (9) Michigan State; Second Round	L 64–67	16–14	Target Center (4,908); Minneapolis, MN
WNIT
March 15, 2023; 6:00 pm, BTN+		Missouri State; First Round	W 74–65	17–14	Pinnacle Bank Arena (4,116); Lincoln, NE
March 19, 2023; 2:00 pm, BTN+		Northern Iowa; Second Round	W 77–57	18–14	Pinnacle Bank Arena (6,478); Lincoln, NE
March 23, 2023; 6:30 pm, ESPN+		at Kansas; Super 16	L 55–64	18–15	Allen Fieldhouse (3,730); Lawrence, KS
*Non-conference game. ^{#}Rankings from AP Poll. (#) Tournament seedings in parentheses. All times are in Central.

== Rankings ==
Ranking movements Legend: ██ Increase in ranking ██ Decrease in ranking RV = Received votes
	Week																			
Poll	Pre	1	2	3	4	5	6	7	8	9	10	11	12	13	14	15	16	17	18	Final
AP	22	22	22	RV																Not released
Coaches	22	22	22																	

== See also ==
- 2022–23 Nebraska Cornhuskers men's basketball team
