= 2022–23 Northwestern Wildcats women's basketball team =

American college basketball season

2022–23 Northwestern Wildcats women's basketball
- Conference: Big Ten Conference
- Record: 9–21 (2–16 Big Ten)
- Head coach: Joe McKeown (15th season)
- Associate head coach: Tangela Smith
- Assistant coaches: Maggie Lyon; Brittany Johnson
- Home arena: Welsh–Ryan Arena

2022–23 Big Ten women's basketball standings
	Conf.				Overall
Team	W		L	PCT	W		L	PCT
No. 2 Indiana	16	–	2	.889	28	–	4	.875
No. 3 Iowa †	15	–	3	.833	31	–	7	.816
No. 7 Maryland	15	–	3	.833	28	–	7	.800
No. 12 Ohio State	12	–	6	.667	28	–	8	.778
No. 18 Michigan	11	–	7	.611	23	–	10	.697
Illinois	11	–	7	.611	22	–	10	.688
Purdue	9	–	8	.529	19	–	11	.633
Nebraska	8	–	10	.444	18	–	15	.545
Michigan State	7	–	10	.412	16	–	14	.533
Wisconsin	6	–	12	.333	11	–	20	.355
Rutgers	5	–	13	.278	12	–	20	.375
Minnesota	4	–	14	.222	11	–	19	.367
Penn State	4	–	14	.222	14	–	17	.452
Northwestern	2	–	16	.111	9	–	21	.300
† 2023 Big Ten tournament winner As of April 2, 2023; Rankings from AP poll

The 2022–23 Northwestern Wildcats women's basketball team represented Northwestern University in the 2022–23 NCAA Division I women's basketball season. Led by 15th-year head coach Joe McKeown, the team played their games at the Welsh–Ryan Arena in Evanston, Illinois as members of the Big Ten Conference.

The Wildcats finished the season 9–21, 2–16 in Big Ten play, to finish in 14th (last) place. As the #14 seed in the Big Ten tournament, they were defeated by #11 seed Rutgers in the first round.

== Schedule and results ==
Date time, TV	Rank^{#}	Opponent^{#}	Result	Record	Site (attendance) city, state
Exhibition
November 1, 2022*; 7:00 p.m., BTN+		Parkside	W 88–72		Welsh–Ryan Arena (278); Evanston, IL
Regular season
November 7, 2022*; 5:00 p.m.		at No. 20 Oregon	L 57–100	0–1	Matthew Knight Arena (5,661); Eugene, OR
November 13, 2022*; 12:00 p.m.		Penn	W 63–55	1–1	Welsh–Ryan Arena; Evanston, IL
November 16, 2022*; 8:00 p.m., BTN		No. 9 Notre Dame	L 58–92	1–2	Welsh–Ryan Arena (1,176); Evanston, IL
November 19, 2022*; 2:00 p.m.		Southern Illinois	W 84–69	2–2	Welsh–Ryan Arena (1,042); Evanston, IL
November 22, 2022*; 7:00 p.m.		Niagara	W 76–38	3–2	Welsh–Ryan Arena (836); Evanston, IL
November 27, 2022*; 2:00 p.m.		Valparaiso	W 81–47	4–2	Welsh–Ryan Arena (976); Evanston, IL
December 1, 2022*; 4:00 p.m., ACCN		at Duke; ACC–Big Ten Women's Challenge	L 50–66	4–3	Cameron Indoor Stadium (1,089); Durham, NC
December 4, 2022; 1:00 p.m.		at No. 17 Michigan	L 66–77	4–4 (0–1)	Crisler Center (2,835); Ann Arbor, MI
December 10, 2022*; 2:00 p.m.		DePaul	L 63–81	4–5	Welsh–Ryan Arena (1,263); Evanston, IL
December 14, 2022*; 7:00 p.m.		at UIC	W 66–62	5–5	Credit Union 1 Arena (880); Chicago, IL
December 17, 2022*; 6:00 p.m.		Air Force	W 64–58	6–5	Welsh–Ryan Arena (891); Evanston, IL
December 22, 2022*; 12:00 p.m.		Chicago State	Postponed		Welsh–Ryan Arena; Evanston, IL
December 28, 2022; 8:00 p.m.		No. 3 Ohio State	L 48–81	6–6 (0–2)	Welsh–Ryan Arena (1,372); Evanston, IL
January 2, 2023; 7:00 p.m.		Michigan State	L 64–71	6–7 (0–3)	Welsh–Ryan Arena (1,282); Evanston, IL
January 5, 2023; 8:00 p.m., BTN		at Illinois	L 79–85	6–8 (0–4)	State Farm Center (1,904); Champaign, IL
January 8, 2023; 2:00 p.m.		No. 6 Indiana	L 50–72	6–9 (0–5)	Welsh–Ryan Arena (1,923); Evanston, IL
January 11, 2023; 6:30 p.m.		at No. 12 Iowa	L 64–93	6–10 (0–6)	Carver–Hawkeye Arena (8,384); Iowa City, IA
January 14, 2023; 2:00 p.m.		Purdue	L 54–65	6–11 (0–7)	Welsh–Ryan Arena (1,566); Evanston, IL
January 19, 2023; 5:30 p.m., BTN		at No. 2 Ohio State	L 54–84	6–12 (0–8)	Value City Arena (4,698); Columbus, OH
January 22, 2023; 2:00 p.m.		No. 21 Illinois	L 64–67	6–13 (0–9)	Welsh–Ryan Arena (2,276); Evanston, IL
January 25, 2023*; 7:00 p.m.		Chicago State	W 87–64	7–13	Welsh–Ryan Arena (766); Evanston, IL
January 29, 2023; 1:00 p.m.		at Wisconsin	W 70–67	8–13 (1–9)	Kohl Center (8,217); Madison, WI
February 2, 2023; 6:00 p.m.		at Penn State	L 64–74	8–14 (1–10)	Bryce Jordan Center (1,977); University Park, PA
February 6, 2023; 6:00 p.m., BTN		Nebraska	L 66–78	8–15 (1–11)	Welsh–Ryan Arena (1,459); Evanston, IL
February 9, 2023; 7:30 p.m., BTN		No. 8 Maryland	L 54–79	8–16 (1–12)	Welsh–Ryan Arena (1,085); Evanston, IL
February 12, 2023; 1:00 p.m.		at Purdue	L 61–76	8–17 (1–13)	Mackey Arena (3,831); West Lafayette, IN
February 15, 2023; 6:00 p.m.		at Rutgers	L 48–62	8–18 (1–14)	Jersey Mike's Arena (1,258); Piscataway, NJ
February 18, 2023; 2:00 p.m.		Minnesota	W 76–62	9–18 (2–14)	Welsh–Ryan Arena (1,582); Evanston, IL
February 23, 2023; 6:00 p.m., BTN		Wisconsin	L 57–64	9–19 (2–15)	Welsh–Ryan Arena (2,077); Evanston, IL
February 26, 2023; 6:00 p.m., BTN+		at Nebraska	L 64–80	9–20 (2–16)	Pinnacle Bank Arena (6,232); Lincoln, NE
Big Ten tournament
March 1, 2023; 3:30 p.m., BTN	(14)	vs. (11) Rutgers	L 59–63	9–21	Target Center (4,890); Minneapolis, MN
*Non-conference game. ^{#}Rankings from AP poll. (#) Tournament seedings in parentheses. All times are in Central.

== See also ==
- 2022–23 Northwestern Wildcats men's basketball team
