= 2022–23 Rutgers Scarlet Knights women's basketball team =

American college basketball season

2022–23 Rutgers Scarlet Knights women's basketball
- Conference: Big Ten Conference
- Record: 12–20 (5–13 Big Ten)
- Head coach: Coquese Washington (1st season)
- Assistant coaches: Tasha Pointer; Nikki McCray; John Hampton
- Home arena: Jersey Mike's Arena

2022–23 Big Ten women's basketball standings
	Conf.				Overall
Team	W		L	PCT	W		L	PCT
No. 2 Indiana	16	–	2	.889	28	–	4	.875
No. 3 Iowa †	15	–	3	.833	31	–	7	.816
No. 7 Maryland	15	–	3	.833	28	–	7	.800
No. 12 Ohio State	12	–	6	.667	28	–	8	.778
No. 18 Michigan	11	–	7	.611	23	–	10	.697
Illinois	11	–	7	.611	22	–	10	.688
Purdue	9	–	8	.529	19	–	11	.633
Nebraska	8	–	10	.444	18	–	15	.545
Michigan State	7	–	10	.412	16	–	14	.533
Wisconsin	6	–	12	.333	11	–	20	.355
Rutgers	5	–	13	.278	12	–	20	.375
Minnesota	4	–	14	.222	11	–	19	.367
Penn State	4	–	14	.222	14	–	17	.452
Northwestern	2	–	16	.111	9	–	21	.300
† 2023 Big Ten tournament winner As of April 2, 2023; Rankings from AP poll

The 2022–23 Rutgers Scarlet Knights women's basketball team represented Rutgers University in the 2022–23 college basketball season. Led by first-year head coach Coquese Washington, the team played their games at the Jersey Mike's Arena and are members of the Big Ten Conference. They finished the season 12–20, 5–13 in Big Ten play, to finish in 11th place. They defeated Northwestern in the first round of the Big Ten tournament before losing to Illinois.

== Schedule and results ==
Date time, TV	Rank^{#}	Opponent^{#}	Result	Record	Site (attendance) city, state
Regular season
November 7, 2022*; 11:00 a.m., BTN+		Hofstra	W 73–68	1–0	Jersey Mike's Arena (831); Piscataway, NJ
November 11, 2022*; 7:00 p.m., BTN+		Seton Hall	L 57–75	1–1	Jersey Mike's Arena (1,387); Piscataway, NJ
November 13, 2022*; 2:00 p.m., BTN+		NJIT	W 87–71	2–1	Jersey Mike's Arena (1,161); Piscataway, NJ
November 16, 2022*; 7:00 p.m., BTN+		North Carolina Central	W 66–45	3–1	Jersey Mike's Arena (1,029); Piscataway, NJ
November 19, 2022*; 12:00 p.m., FloSports		vs. No. 11 Tennessee; Battle 4 Atlantis quarterfinals	L 54–94	3–2	Atlantis Paradise Island (212); Paradise Island, Bahamas
November 20, 2022*; 5:00 p.m., FloSports		vs. South Dakota State; Battle 4 Atlantis consolation second round	L 56–75	3–3	Atlantis Paradise Island (128); Paradise Island, Bahamas
November 21, 2022*; 7:30 p.m., FloSports		vs. No. 19 Texas; Battle 4 Atlantis seventh-place game	L 44–82	3–4	Atlantis Paradise Island (155); Paradise Island, Bahamas
November 27, 2022*; 2:00 p.m., BTN+		Cornell	W 71–52	4–4	Jersey Mike's Arena (1,192); Piscataway, NJ
November 30, 2022*; 7:00 p.m., ACC RSN		at Boston College	L 61–75	4–5	Conte Forum (465); Chestnut Hill, MA
December 4, 2022; 12:00 p.m., BTN		No. 4 Ohio State	L 70–82	4–6 (0–1)	Jersey Mike's Arena (2,649); Piscataway, NJ
December 7, 2022; 8:00 p.m., BTN+		at Illinois	L 70–82	4–7 (0–2)	State Farm Center (1,771); Champaign, IL
December 10, 2022*; 2:00 p.m., BTN+		Hampton	W 76–68	5–7	Jersey Mike's Arena (1,172); Piscataway, NJ
December 15, 2022*; 7:00 p.m., BTN+		Princeton; Rivalry	L 56–77	5–8	Jersey Mike's Arena (1,161); Piscataway, NJ
December 18, 2022*; 2:00 p.m., BTN		New Orleans	W 64–56	6–8	Jersey Mike's Arena (1,016); Piscataway, NJ
December 30, 2022; 5:00 p.m., BTN+		at Penn State	L 72–90	6–9 (0–3)	Bryce Jordan Center (2,368); University Park, PA
January 2, 2023; 2:00 p.m., BTN		No. 13 Maryland	L 67–78	6–10 (0–4)	Jersey Mike's Arena (2,546); Piscataway, NJ
January 7, 2023; 2:00 p.m., BTN		Nebraska	W 57–45	7–10 (1–4)	Jersey Mike's Arena (3,223); Piscataway, NJ
January 12, 2023; 8:30 p.m., BTN		at Minnesota	W 65–59	8–10 (2–4)	Williams Arena (2,238); Minneapolis, MN
January 15, 2023; 1:00 p.m., BTN+		at No. 9 Maryland	L 56–80	8–11 (2–5)	Xfinity Center (6,591); College Park, MD
January 19, 2023; 8:30 p.m., BTN		No. 14 Michigan	L 58–81	8–12 (2–6)	Jersey Mike's Arena (1,105); Piscataway, NJ
January 22, 2023; 3:00 p.m., BTN+		at Michigan State	L 63–85	8–13 (2–7)	Breslin Student Events Center (5,015); East Lansing, MI
January 26, 2023; 7:00 p.m., BTN+		Penn State	W 86–82 ^{OT}	9–13 (3–7)	Jersey Mike's Arena (1,204); Piscataway, NJ
January 29, 2023; 2:00 p.m., BTN+		at No. 6 Indiana	L 68–91	9–14 (3–8)	Simon Skjodt Assembly Hall (8,598); Bloomington, IN
February 5, 2023; 2:00 p.m., BTN+		Wisconsin	W 73–67	10–14 (4–8)	Jersey Mike's Arena (5,662); Piscataway, NJ
February 9, 2023; 7:00 p.m., BTN+		Purdue	L 54–68	10–15 (4–9)	Jersey Mike's Arena (1,149); Piscataway, NJ
February 12, 2023; 3:00 p.m., FS1		at No. 5 Iowa	L 57–111	10–16 (4–10)	Carver–Hawkeye Arena (13,150); Iowa City, IA
February 15, 2023; 7:00 p.m., BTN+		Northwestern	W 62–48	11–16 (5–10)	Jersey Mike's Arena (1,258); Piscataway, NJ
February 20, 2023; 8:00 p.m., BTN		at Wisconsin	L 62–88	11–17 (5–11)	Kohl Center (3,201); Madison, WI
February 23, 2023; 8:30 p.m., BTN+		at No. 12 Michigan	L 53–71	11–18 (5–12)	Crisler Center (2,402); Ann Arbor, MI
February 26, 2023; 2:00 p.m., BTN+		No. 25 Illinois	L 53–75	11–19 (5–13)	Jersey Mike's Arena (2,049); Piscataway, NJ
Big Ten women's tournament
March 1, 2023; 4:30 p.m., BTN	(11)	vs. (14) Northwestern; First round	W 63–59	12–19	Target Center (4,980); Minneapolis, MN
March 2, 2023; 8:00 p.m., BTN	(11)	vs. (6) Illinois; Second round	L 55–81	12–20	Target Center (5,124); Minneapolis, MN
*Non-conference game. ^{#}Rankings from AP poll. (#) Tournament seedings in parentheses. All times are in Eastern.

== See also ==
- 2022–23 Rutgers Scarlet Knights men's basketball team
