= 2023 Big Ten women's basketball tournament =

College basketball tournament

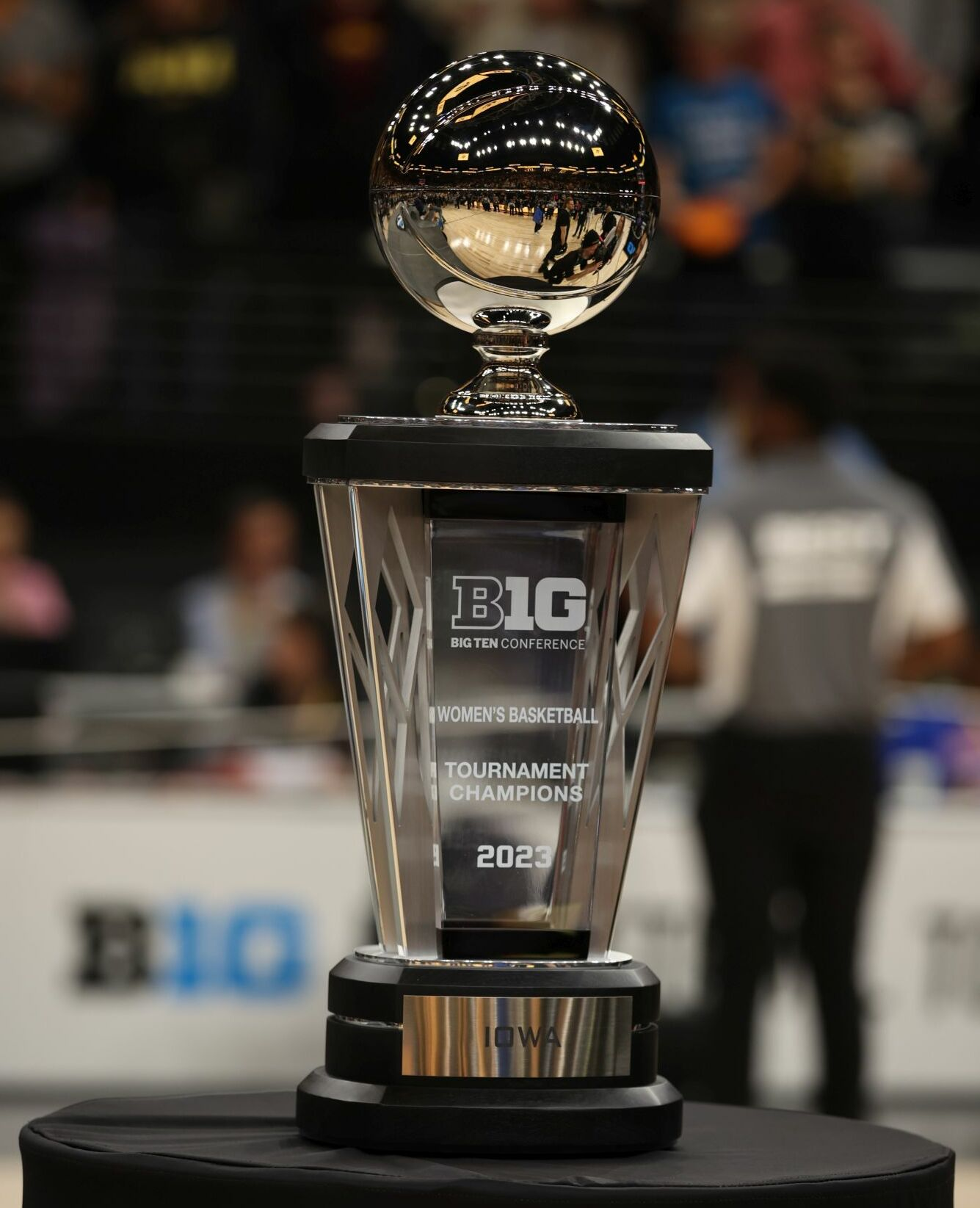
- 2023 tournament trophy
- Classification: Division I
- Season: 2022–23
- Teams: 14
- Site: Target Center; Minneapolis, MN
- Champions: Iowa (5th title)
- Winning coach: Lisa Bluder (4th title)
- MVP: Caitlin Clark (Iowa)
- Attendance: 47,883
- Television: BTN, ESPN

2022–23 Big Ten women's basketball standings
	Conf.				Overall
Team	W		L	PCT	W		L	PCT
No. 2 Indiana	16	–	2	.889	28	–	4	.875
No. 3 Iowa †	15	–	3	.833	31	–	7	.816
No. 7 Maryland	15	–	3	.833	28	–	7	.800
No. 12 Ohio State	12	–	6	.667	28	–	8	.778
No. 18 Michigan	11	–	7	.611	23	–	10	.697
Illinois	11	–	7	.611	22	–	10	.688
Purdue	9	–	8	.529	19	–	11	.633
Nebraska	8	–	10	.444	18	–	15	.545
Michigan State	7	–	10	.412	16	–	14	.533
Wisconsin	6	–	12	.333	11	–	20	.355
Rutgers	5	–	13	.278	12	–	20	.375
Minnesota	4	–	14	.222	11	–	19	.367
Penn State	4	–	14	.222	14	–	17	.452
Northwestern	2	–	16	.111	9	–	21	.300
† 2023 Big Ten tournament winner As of April 2, 2023; Rankings from AP poll

The 2023 Big Ten women's basketball tournament was held from March 1–5, 2023 at Target Center in Minneapolis. As the tournament winner, Iowa received the conference's automatic bid to the 2023 NCAA Division I women's basketball tournament. This was the last year of the tournament in which the preliminary rounds were broadcast on Big Ten Network and the final was broadcast on ESPN, as in 2024 these would move to Peacock and CBS, respectively.

== Seeds ==
All 14 Big Ten schools participated in the tournament. Teams were seeded by 2022–23 Big Ten Conference season record. The top 10 teams received a first-round bye and the top four teams received a double bye.

Seed	School	Conf	Tiebreak 1	Tiebreak 2
1	Indiana‡##	16–2		
2	Iowa##	15–3	1–1 vs. Maryland	1–1 vs. Indiana
3	Maryland##	15–3	1–1 vs. Iowa	0–1 vs. Indiana
4	Ohio State##	12–6		
5	Michigan#	11–7	1–0 vs. Illinois	
6	Illinois#	11–7	0–1 vs. Michigan	
7	Purdue#	9–8		
8	Nebraska#	8–10		
9	Michigan State#	7–10		
10	Wisconsin#	6–12		
11	Rutgers	5–13		
12	Minnesota	4–14	2–0 vs. Penn State	
13	Penn State	4–14	0–2 vs. Minnesota	
14	Northwestern	2–16		
‡ – Big Ten Conference regular season champions. ## – Received a double bye in the conference tournament. # – Received a first-round bye in the conference tournament. Overall record are as of the end of the regular season.

== Schedule ==
Game	Time*	Matchup^{#}	Score	Television	Attendance
First round – Wednesday, March 1
1	2:00 pm	No. 12 Minnesota vs. No. 13 Penn State	67−72	BTN	4,890
2	4:30 pm	No. 11 Rutgers vs. No. 14 Northwestern	63−59	BTN	4,890
Second round – Thursday, March 2
3	12:30 pm	No. 8 Nebraska vs. No. 9 Michigan State	64−67	BTN	4,908
4	25 min. after game 3	No. 5 Michigan vs. No. 13 Penn State	63−61	BTN	4,908
5	6:30 pm	No. 7 Purdue vs. No. 10 Wisconsin	57−55	BTN	5,124
6	25 min. after game 5	No. 6 Illinois vs. No. 11 Rutgers	81−55	BTN	5,124
Quarterfinals – Friday, March 3
7	12:30 pm	No. 1 Indiana vs. No. 9 Michigan State	94−85	BTN	5,544
8	3:20pm	No. 4 Ohio State vs. No. 5 Michigan	81−79	BTN	5,544
9	6:30 pm	No. 2 Iowa vs. No. 7 Purdue	69−58	BTN	8,577
10	25 min. after game 9	No. 3 Maryland vs. No. 6 Illinois	73−58	BTN	8,577
Semifinals – Saturday, March 4
11	2:30 pm	No.1 Indiana vs. No. 4 Ohio State	75−79	BTN	9,375
12	5:00 pm	No. 2 Iowa vs. No. 3 Maryland	89−84	BTN	9,375
Championship – Sunday, March 5
13	5:00 pm	No. 4 Ohio State vs. No. 2 Iowa	72−105	ESPN	9,505
*Game times in Eastern Time. #Rankings denote tournament seeding.

== Bracket ==
- All times are Eastern.

First round Wednesday, March 1 BTN
12	Minnesota	67
13	Penn State	72
11	Rutgers	63
14	Northwestern	59

Second round Thursday, March 2 BTN
8	Nebraska	64
9	Michigan State	67
5	Michigan	63
13	Penn State	61
7	Purdue	57
10	Wisconsin	55
6	Illinois	81
11	Rutgers	55

Quarterfinals; Friday, March 3 BTN
1	Indiana	94
9	Michigan State	85
4	Ohio State	81
5	Michigan	79
2	Iowa	69
7	Purdue	58
3	Maryland	73
6	Illinois	58

Semifinals; Saturday, March 4 BTN
1	Indiana	75
4	Ohio State	79
2	Iowa	89
3	Maryland	84

Championship; Sunday, March 5 ESPN
4	Ohio State	72
2	Iowa	105

* denotes overtime period

== All-Tournament team ==
- Caitlin Clark, Iowa – Most Outstanding Player
- Monika Czinano, Iowa
- Gabbie Marshall, Iowa
- Diamond Miller, Maryland
- Cotie McMahon, Ohio State
- Taylor Thierry, Ohio State
