= 2024–25 Ohio State Buckeyes women's basketball team =

American college basketball season

2024–25 Ohio State Buckeyes women's basketball

NCAA tournament, Second round
- Conference: Big Ten Conference

Ranking
- Coaches: No. 13
- AP: No. 15
- Record: 26–7 (13–5 Big Ten)
- Head coach: Kevin McGuff (12th season)
- Associate head coach: Carla Morrow
- Assistant coaches: Ryan Murray; Jalen Powell; Katie Smith
- Home arena: Value City Arena

2024–25 Big Ten women's basketball standings
	Conf.				Overall
Team	W		L	PCT	W		L	PCT
No. 5 USC	17	–	1	.944	31	–	4	.886
No. 3 UCLA †	16	–	2	.889	34	–	3	.919
No. 19 Ohio State	13	–	5	.722	26	–	7	.788
No. 12 Maryland	13	–	5	.722	25	–	8	.758
No. 25 Michigan	11	–	7	.611	23	–	11	.676
Michigan State	11	–	7	.611	22	–	10	.688
Illinois	11	–	7	.611	22	–	10	.688
Oregon	10	–	8	.556	20	–	12	.625
Indiana	10	–	8	.556	20	–	13	.606
Nebraska	10	–	8	.556	21	–	12	.636
Iowa	10	–	8	.556	23	–	11	.676
Washington	9	–	9	.500	19	–	14	.576
Minnesota	8	–	10	.444	25	–	11	.694
Wisconsin	4	–	14	.222	13	–	17	.433
Rutgers	3	–	15	.167	13	–	20	.394
Purdue	3	–	15	.167	10	–	19	.345
Northwestern	2	–	16	.111	9	–	18	.333
Penn State	1	–	17	.056	10	–	19	.345
† 2025 Big Ten tournament winner As of April 7, 2025; Rankings from AP poll

The 2024–25 Ohio State Buckeyes women's basketball team represented Ohio State University during the 2024–25 NCAA Division I women's basketball season. The Buckeyes were led by head coach Kevin McGuff in his 12th season, and played their home games at Value City Arena in Columbus, Ohio as a member of the Big Ten Conference.

== Previous season ==
The Buckeyes finished the 2023–24 season with a 26–6 record, including 16–2 in Big Ten play to finish in first place. As the No. 1 seed in the Big Ten tournament, they got a double bye to the quarterfinals, where they lost to the No. 8 seed Maryland, eliminating them from the tournament. They received an at-large bid to the 2024 NCAA Division I women's basketball tournament, where they beat the No. 15 seed Maine in the first round, before losing to the No. 7 seed Duke in the second round, ending their season.

== Offseason ==
=== Departures ===
Ohio State departures
Name	Num	Pos.	Height	Year	Hometown	Reason for departure
Rikki Harris	1	G	5'10"	(redshirt) Senior	Indianapolis, IN	Transferred to Dayton
Jacy Sheldon	4	G	5'10"	Graduate student	Dublin, OH	Graduated/2024 WNBA draft; selected 5th overall by Dallas Wings
Emma Shumate	5	G	6'1"	(redshirt) Sophomore	Dresden, OH	Transferred to Michigan State
Celeste Taylor	12	G	5'11'	Graduate student	Valley Stream, NY	Graduated/2024 WNBA draft; selected 15th overall by Indiana Fever
Taiyier Parks	14	F	6'3"	Graduate student	Cleveland, OH	Graduated
Karla Vreš	15	F	6'3"	Graduate student	Zagreb, Croatia	Graduated
Diana Collins	20	G	5'9"	Freshman	Lilburn, GA	Transferred to Alabama
Eboni Walker	22	F	6'0"	Graduate student	Las Vegas, NV	Graduated
Rebeka Mikulášiková	23	F	6'3"	Graduate student	Nitra, Slovakia	Graduated

=== Incoming transfers ===
Ohio State incoming transfers
Name	Num	Pos.	Height	Year	Hometown	Previous school
Ajae Petty	1	F	6'3"	Graduate student	Baltimore, MD	Kentucky
Chance Gray	21	G	5'9"	Junior	Cincinnati, OH	Oregon

=== 2024 recruiting class ===
College recruiting
Name	Hometown	School	Height	Weight	Commit date
Jaloni Cambridge; PG	Nashville, TN	Montverde Academy	5 ft 6 in (1.68 m)	N/A	
Jaloni Cambridge; PG	Recruit ratings: ESPN: (98)				
Ava Watson; PG	Buford, GA	Buford High School	5 ft 8 in (1.73 m)	N/A	
Ava Watson; PG	Recruit ratings: ESPN: (94)				
Ella Hobbs; F	Concord, NC	1 of 1 Academy	6 ft 4 in (1.93 m)	N/A	
Ella Hobbs; F	Recruit ratings: ESPN: (91)				
Overall recruit ranking:
Note: In many cases, Scout, Rivals, 247Sports, On3, and ESPN may conflict in their listings of height and weight.; In these cases, the average was taken. ESPN grades are on a 100-point scale.; Sources: "2024 Player Commits". ESPN. Archived from the original on February 21, 2025.

==== Recruiting class of 2025 ====
College recruiting (2025)
Name	Hometown	School	Height	Weight	Commit date
Daria Biriuk; G	Bell Buckle, TN	The Webb School	6 ft 1 in (1.85 m)	N/A	
Daria Biriuk; G	Recruit ratings: ESPN: (92)				
Overall recruit ranking:
Note: In many cases, Scout, Rivals, 247Sports, On3, and ESPN may conflict in their listings of height and weight.; In these cases, the average was taken. ESPN grades are on a 100-point scale.; Sources: "2025 Player Commits". ESPN. Archived from the original on February 21, 2025.

== Roster ==
2024–25 Ohio State Buckeyes women's basketball team
Players
Coaches

Pos.	#	Name	Height	Year	Previous school	Hometown
G	0	Madison Greene	5 ft 8 in (1.73 m)	GS	Pickerington Central	Pickerington, OH
F	1	Ajae Petty	6 ft 3 in (1.91 m)	GS	Baltimore Polytechnic Institute; Kentucky	Baltimore, MD
G/F	2	Taylor Thierry	6 ft 0 in (1.83 m)	Sr	Laurel	Cleveland, OH
G	3	Kennedy Cambridge	5 ft 8 in (1.73 m)	RS So	Ensworth; Kentucky	Nashville, TN
G	5	Ava Watson	5 ft 8 in (1.73 m)	Fr	Buford	Buford, GA
G	11	Kaia Henderson	5 ft 6 in (1.68 m)	Jr	New Hartford Sr	Utica, NY
C	12	Elsa Lemmilä	6 ft 6 in (1.98 m)	Fr	Tapiolan Honka Club	Espoo, Finland
F	14	Ella Hobbs	6 ft 4 in (1.93 m)	Fr	Jay M. Robinson	Concord, NC
F	15	Seini Henry	6 ft 0 in (1.83 m)	Fr	Purcell Marian	Charlotte, NC
G	21	Chance Gray	5 ft 9 in (1.75 m)	Jr	Winton Woods; Oregon	Cincinnati, OH
G	22	Jaloni Cambridge	5 ft 7 in (1.7 m)	Fr	Montverde Academy	Nashville, TN
F	32	Cotie McMahon	6 ft 0 in (1.83 m)	Jr	Centerville	Centerville, OH
C	54	Faith Carson	6 ft 4 in (1.93 m)	So	Buchanan	Buchanan, MI
F	55	Eboni Walker	6 ft 0 in (1.83 m)	GS	Centennial; Syracuse	Las Vegas, NV

Head coach

- Kevin McGuff (Saint Joseph's (IN))

Assistant coach(es)

- Carla Morrow (Tulsa)
- Ryan Murray (Ohio State)
- Jalen Powell (Mississippi)
- Katie Smith (Ohio State)

Legend

- (C) Team captain
- (S) Suspended
- (I) Ineligible
- (W) Walk-on
- Injured
- Current redshirt

Roster

== Schedule and results ==
Date time, TV	Rank^{#}	Opponent^{#}	Result	Record	High points	High rebounds	High assists	Site city, state
Regular season
November 5, 2024*; 6:00 p.m., B1G+	No. 14	Cleveland State	W 104–69	1–0	31 – J. Cambridge	6 – Tied	6 – J. Cambridge	Value City Arena (4,828); Columbus, Ohio
November 12, 2024*; 6:00 p.m., B1G+	No. 12	Charlotte	W 94–53	2–0	31 – Gray	7 – Lemmilä	4 – McMahon	Value City Arena (4,531); Columbus, Ohio
November 17, 2024*; 3:00 p.m., ESPN+	No. 12	at Belmont	W 67–63	3–0	21 – McMahon	10 – Petty	6 – J. Cambridge	Curb Event Center (1,814); Nashville, Tennessee
November 20, 2024*; 7:00 p.m., ESPN+	No. 12	at Ohio	W 106–42	4–0	21 – Lemmilä	14 – Lemmilä	6 – Walker	Convocation Center (4,820); Athens, Ohio
November 24, 2024*; 1:00 p.m., B1G+	No. 12	Bowling Green	W 96–53	5–0	20 – Watson	6 – Tied	7 – Greene	Value City Arena (6,660); Columbus, Ohio
November 28, 2024*; 11:00 p.m., Baller TV	No. 11	vs. Old Dominion; Daytona Beach Classic	W 70–47	6–0	24 – Petty	11 – Petty	6 – J. Cambridge	Ocean Center (60); Daytona Beach, Florida
November 29, 2024*; 3:30 p.m., Baller TV	No. 11	vs. Utah State; Daytona Beach Classic	W 87–51	7–0	17 – Tied	9 – Petty	5 – K. Cambridge	Ocean Center (135); Daytona Beach, Florida
December 8, 2024; 4:00 p.m., BTN	No. 12	No. 21 Illinois	W 83–74	8–0 (1–0)	25 – McMahon	8 – Lemmila	5 – Petty	Value City Arena (6,668); Columbus, Ohio
December 10, 2024*; 6:00 p.m., B1G+	No. 11	Ball State	W 80–48	9–0	21 – Grey	8 – Tied	4 – Gray	Value City Arena (4,977); Columbus, Ohio
December 14, 2024*; 11:00 a.m., B1G+	No. 11	Youngstown State	W 87–39	10–0	29 – McMahon	12 – Petty	4 – Greene	Value City Arena (5,659); Columbus, Ohio
December 17, 2024*; 12:00 p.m., B1G+	No. 11	Grand Valley State	W 82–57	11–0	23 – Gray	8 – Petty	3 – Tied	Value City Arena (4,710); Columbus, Ohio
December 20, 2024*; 8:30 p.m., FS1	No. 11	vs. Stanford; Invisalign Bay Area Women's Classic	W 84–59	12–0	16 – McMahon	9 – Petty	3 – McMahon	Chase Center (3,766); San Francisco, California
December 29, 2024; 2:00 p.m., B1G+	No. 10	at Rutgers	W 77–63	13–0 (2–0)	16 – Tied	11 – McMahon	7 – J. Cambridge	Jersey Mike's Arena (2,929); Piscataway, New Jersey
January 5, 2025; 1:00 p.m., B1G+	No. 10	Northwestern	W 92–62	14–0 (3–0)	20 – J. Cambridge	6 – J. Cambridge	3 – J. Cambridge	Value City Arena (7,190); Columbus, Ohio
January 8, 2025; 7:00 p.m., B1G+	No. 9	at No. 25 Michigan; Rivalry	W 84–77	15–0 (4–0)	29 – J. Cambridge	7 – 2 tied	4 – J. Cambridge	Crisler Center (5,112); Ann Arbor, Michigan
January 12, 2025; 1:00 p.m., B1G+	No. 9	Oregon	W 69–60	16–0 (5–0)	20 – Thierry	14 – Petty	4 – Petty	Value City Arena (8,664); Columbus, Ohio
January 16, 2025; 9:00 p.m., Peacock	No. 9	at Wisconsin	W 80–69	17–0 (6–0)	27 – J. Cambridge	8 – Tied	4 – J. Cambridge	Kohl Center (2,820); Madison, Wisconsin
January 19, 2025; 1:00 p.m., B1G+	No. 9	at Penn State	L 59–62	17–1 (6–1)	19 – McMahon	7 – Petty	6 – McMahon	Bryce Jordan Center (2,817); University Park, Pennsylvania
January 23, 2025; 6:00 p.m., BTN	No. 12	No. 8 Maryland	W 74–66	18–1 (7–1)	20 – J. Cambridge	8 – J. Cambridge	3 – K. Cambridge	Value City Arena (7,082); Columbus, Ohio
January 26, 2025; 3:00 p.m., B1G+	No. 12	at Nebraska	W 72–66	19–1 (8–1)	23 – Thierry	10 – McMahon	3 – Tied	Pinnacle Bank Arena (9,772); Lincoln, Nebraska
February 2, 2025; 5:00 p.m., BTN	No. 8	Washington	W 66–56	20–1 (9–1)	19 – McMahon	6 – Thierry	3 – Thierry	Value City Arena (8,602); Columbus, Ohio
February 5, 2025; 9:30 p.m., Peacock	No. 8	at No. 1 UCLA	L 52–65	20–2 (9–2)	21 – J. Cambridge	8 – J. Cambridge	6 – J. Cambridge	Pauley Pavilion (6,822); Los Angeles, California
February 8, 2025; 9:00 p.m., FOX	No. 8	at No. 7 USC	L 63–84	20–3 (9–3)	14 – Thierry	5 – Tied	4 – Petty	Galen Center (8,892); Los Angeles, CA
February 13, 2025; 7:30 p.m., Peacock	No. 9	Minnesota	W 87–84 ^{OT}	21–3 (10–3)	25 – McMahon	7 – Thierry	6 – McMahon	Value City Arena (6,417); Columbus, Ohio
February 17, 2025; 12:00 p.m., FOX	No. 8	Iowa	W 86–78 ^{OT}	22–3 (11–3)	29 – J. Cambridge	9 – Lemmila	4 – J. Cambridge	Value City Arena (8,810); Columbus, Ohio
February 20, 2025; 7:00 p.m., Peacock	No. 8	at Indiana	L 61–71	22–4 (11–4)	18 – J. Cambridge	4 – Tied	2 – J. Cambridge	Simon Skjodt Assembly Hall (10,772); Bloomington, Indiana
February 23, 2025; 12:00 p.m., BTN	No. 8	Purdue	W 98–46	23–4 (12–4)	21 – Gray	11 – Petty	5 – K. Cambridge	Value City Arena (8,567); Columbus, Ohio
February 26, 2025; 7:00 p.m., B1G+	No. 12	No. 23 Michigan State	W 89–78	24–4 (13–4)	33 – J. Cambridge	15 – Petty	6 – Petty	Value City Arena (7,207); Columbus, Ohio
March 2, 2025; 4:30 p.m., FS1	No. 12	at No. 19 Maryland	L 90–93 ^{OT}	24–5 (13–5)	21 – Thierry	10 – Petty	3 – Petty	Xfinity Center (9,335); College Park, Maryland
Big Ten Women's Tournament
March 7, 2025; 9:00 p.m., BTN	(3) No. 13	vs. (11) Iowa; Quarterfinals	W 60–59	25–5	18 – McMahon	12 – Petty	5 – J. Cambridge	Gainbridge Fieldhouse (7,500); Indianapolis, Indiana
March 8, 2025; 5:30 p.m., BTN	(3) No. 13	vs. (2) No. 4 UCLA; Semifinals	L 46–75	25–6	10 – J. Cambridge	4 – Tied	3 – K. Cambridge	Gainbridge Fieldhouse (7,805); Indianapolis, Indiana
NCAA Women's Tournament
March 21, 2025*; 5:30 p.m., ESPN2	(4 B3) No. 15	(13 B3) Montana State; First round	W 71–51	26–6	16 – Thierry	7 – Petty	7 – J. Cambridge	Value City Arena; Columbus, Ohio
March 23, 2025*; 8:00 p.m., ESPN	(4 B3) No. 15	(5 B3) No. 20 Tennessee; Second round	L 67–82	26–7	19 – J. Cambridge	6 – Tied	3 – Tied	Value City Arena; Columbus, Ohio
*Non-conference game. ^{#}Rankings from AP Poll. (#) Tournament seedings in parentheses. B3=Birmingham 3. All times are in Eastern. Source:

== Rankings ==
Ranking movements Legend: ██ Increase in ranking ██ Decrease in ranking
	Week																				
Poll	Pre	1	2	3	4	5	6	7	8	9	10	11	12	13	14	15	16	17	18	19	Final
AP	14	12	12	11	12	11	11	10	10	9	9	12	8	8	9	8	12	13	15	15	
Coaches	14	12	11	9	7	8	9	9	9	9	8	12	8	8	8	8	12	12	13	13	
