= 2023–24 Ohio State Buckeyes women's basketball team =

American college basketball season

2023–24 Ohio State Buckeyes women's basketball

Big Ten regular season champions

NCAA tournament, Second round
- Conference: Big Ten Conference

Ranking
- Coaches: No. 14
- AP: No. 16
- Record: 26–6 (16–2 Big Ten)
- Head coach: Kevin McGuff (11th season)
- Associate head coach: Carla Morrow
- Assistant coaches: Wesley Brooks; Jalen Powell
- Home arena: Value City Arena

2023–24 Big Ten women's basketball standings
| | Conf. | | | | Overall |
| Team | W | | L | PCT | W | | L | PCT |
|---|---|---|---|---|---|---|---|---|
| No. 16 Ohio State | 16 | – | 2 | .889 | 26 | – | 6 | .813 |
| No. 2 Iowa † | 15 | – | 3 | .833 | 34 | – | 5 | .872 |
| No. 12 Indiana | 15 | – | 3 | .833 | 26 | – | 6 | .813 |
| Michigan State | 12 | – | 6 | .667 | 22 | – | 9 | .710 |
| Nebraska | 11 | – | 7 | .611 | 23 | – | 12 | .657 |
| Michigan | 9 | – | 9 | .500 | 20 | – | 14 | .588 |
| Penn State | 9 | – | 9 | .500 | 22 | – | 13 | .629 |
| Maryland | 9 | – | 9 | .500 | 19 | – | 14 | .576 |
| Illinois | 8 | – | 10 | .444 | 19 | – | 15 | .559 |
| Wisconsin | 6 | – | 12 | .333 | 15 | – | 17 | .469 |
| Minnesota | 5 | – | 13 | .278 | 20 | – | 16 | .556 |
| Purdue | 5 | – | 13 | .278 | 15 | – | 19 | .441 |
| Northwestern | 4 | – | 14 | .222 | 9 | – | 21 | .300 |
| Rutgers | 2 | – | 16 | .111 | 8 | – | 24 | .250 |
† 2024 Big Ten tournament winner Rankings from AP Poll

The 2023–24 Ohio State Buckeyes women's basketball team represented Ohio State University during the 2023–24 NCAA Division I women's basketball season. The Buckeyes were led by head coach Kevin McGuff in his 11th season, and played their games at Value City Arena as a member of the Big Ten Conference.

== Previous season ==
The Buckeyes finished the 2022–23 season with a 28–8 record, including 12–6 in Big Ten play to finish in fourth place. They received an at-large bid to the 2023 NCAA Division I women's basketball tournament, and advanced to the Elite Eight for the first time since 1993, before being eliminated by Virginia Tech.

== Offseason ==
=== Departures ===
Ohio State departures
| Name | Num | Pos. | Height | Year | Hometown | Reason for departure |
|---|---|---|---|---|---|---|
| Hevynne Bristow | 3 | G | 6'" | Senior | Brooklyn, NY | Transferred to James Madison |
| Kaitlyn Costner | 20 | G | 5'8" | Sophomore | Osceola, IN | Transferred to Eastern Kentucky |
| Taylor Mikesell | 24 | G | 5'11" | Senior | Massillon, OH | Graduated/2023 WNBA draft; selected 13th overall by Indiana Fever |
| Mya Perry | 12 | G | 5'9" | Freshman | Reynoldsburg, OH | Transferred to Florida Atlantic |
| Taiyier Parks | 14 | F | 6'3" | Graduate student | Cleveland, OH | Graduated |

=== Incoming transfers ===
Ohio State incoming transfers
| Name | Num | Pos. | Height | Year | Hometown | Previous school |
|---|---|---|---|---|---|---|
| Kennedy Cambridge | 3 | F | 6'3" | Redshirt freshman | Nashville, TN | Kentucky |
| Taiyier Parks | 14 | F | 6'3" | Graduate student | Cleveland, OH | Michigan State |
| Celeste Taylor | 12 | G | 5'11" | Graduate student | Valley Stream, NY | Duke |

== Roster ==
2023–24 Ohio State Buckeyes women's basketball team
Players
Coaches

| Pos. | # | Name | Height | Year | Previous school | Hometown |
|---|---|---|---|---|---|---|
| G | 0 | Madison Greene | 5 ft 8 in (1.73 m) | RS Sr | Pickerington Central | Pickerington, OH |
| G | 1 | Rikki Harris | 5 ft 10 in (1.78 m) | RS Sr | North Central | Indianapolis, IN |
| G | 2 | Taylor Thierry | 6 ft 0 in (1.83 m) | Jr | Laurel | Cleveland, OH |
| G | 3 | Kennedy Cambridge | 5 ft 8 in (1.73 m) | So | Ensworth; Kentucky | Nashville, TN |
| G | 4 | Jacy Sheldon | 5 ft 10 in (1.78 m) | GS | Dublin Coffman | Dublin, OH |
| G | 5 | Emma Shumate | 6 ft 1 in (1.85 m) | RS So | Newark; West Virginia | Dresden, OH |
| G | 11 | Kaia Henderson | 6 ft 1 in (1.85 m) | So | New Hartford Sr | Utica, NY |
| G | 12 | Celeste Taylor | 5 ft 11 in (1.8 m) | GS | Long Island Lutheran; Duke | Valley Stream, NY |
| F | 14 | Taiyier Parks | 6 ft 3 in (1.91 m) | GS | North Royalton; Michigan State | Cleveland, OH |
| F | 15 | Karla Vreš | 6 ft 3 in (1.91 m) | GS | JENSEN gymnasium Södra (Sweden); American | Zagreb, Croatia |
| G | 20 | Diana Collins | 5 ft 9 in (1.75 m) | Fr | Brookwood | Lilburn, GA |
| F | 22 | Eboni Walker | 6 ft 0 in (1.83 m) | GS | Centennial; Syracuse | Las Vegas, NV |
| F | 23 | Rebeka Mikulášiková | 6 ft 4 in (1.93 m) | GS | Piaristické Gymnasium | Nitra, Slovakia |
| F | 32 | Cotie McMahon | 6 ft 0 in (1.83 m) | So | Centerville | Centerville, OH |
| C | 54 | Faith Carson | 6 ft 4 in (1.93 m) | Fr | Buchanan | Buchanan, MI |

Head coach

- Kevin McGuff (Saint Joseph's (IN))

Assistant coach(es)

- Carla Morrow (Tulsa)
- Wesley Brooks (West Virginia)
- Jalen Powell (Mississippi)

Legend

- (C) Team captain
- (S) Suspended
- (I) Ineligible
- (W) Walk-on
- Injured
- Current redshirt

Roster

== Schedule and results ==
| Date time, TV | Rank^{#} | Opponent^{#} | Result | Record | Site (attendance) city, state |
Regular season
| November 6, 2023*; 2:00 p.m., TruTV | No. 7 | vs. No. 21 USC; Naismith Hall of Fame Series | L 74–83 | 0–1 | T-Mobile Arena; Las Vegas, NV |
| November 12, 2023*; 1:00 p.m., B1G+ | No. 7 | IUPUI | W 108–58 | 1–1 | Value City Arena (4,933); Columbus, OH |
| November 16, 2023*; 7:00 p.m., B1G+ | No. 13 | Boston College | W 88–66 | 2–1 | Value City Arena (4,523); Columbus, OH |
| November 20, 2023*; 1:30 p.m. | No. 15 | vs. East Carolina; Pink Flamingo Championship | W 79–55 | 3–1 | Baha Mar Convention Center (391); Nassau, Bahamas |
| November 22, 2023*; 6:30 p.m. | No. 15 | vs. Oklahoma State; Pink Flamingo Championship | W 75–57 | 4–1 | Baha Mar Convention Center; Nassau, Bahamas |
| November 26, 2023*; 1:00 p.m., B1G+ | No. 15 | Cornell | W 83–40 | 5–1 | Value City Arena (5,695); Columbus, OH |
| December 3, 2023*; 5:00 p.m., ESPN | No. 16 | at No. 20 Tennessee; Jimmy V Classic | W 78–58 | 6–1 | Thompson–Boling Arena (8,723); Knoxville, TN |
| December 5, 2023*; 7:00 p.m., B1G+ | No. 12 | Ohio | W 85–45 | 7–1 | Value City Arena (4,950); Columbus, OH |
| December 10, 2023; 1:00 p.m., B1G+ | No. 12 | No. 25 Penn State | W 94–84 ^{OT} | 8–1 (1–0) | Value City Arena (6,062); Columbus, OH |
| December 15, 2023*; 6:00 p.m., B1G+ | No. 12т | Grand Valley State | W 73–49 | 9–1 | Value City Arena (4,583); Columbus, OH |
| December 18, 2023*; 6:30 p.m., FS1 | No. 13 | No. 2 UCLA | L 71–77 | 9–2 | Value City Arena (6,800); Columbus, OH |
| December 22, 2023*; 1:00 p.m., B1G+ | No. 13 | Belmont | W 84–55 | 10–2 | Value City Arena (6,336); Columbus, OH |
| December 30, 2023; 12:00 p.m., Fox | No. 17 | at Michigan; Rivalry | L 60–69 | 10–3 (1–1) | Crisler Center (8,078); Ann Arbor, MI |
| January 5, 2024; 8:00 p.m., B1G+ | No. 20 | at Northwestern | W 90–60 | 11–3 (2–1) | Welsh–Ryan Arena (1,872); Evanston, IL |
| January 11, 2024; 6:00 p.m., BTN | No. 17 | Rutgers | W 90–55 | 12–3 (3–1) | Value City Arena (5,227); Columbus, OH |
| January 14, 2024; 4:00 p.m., BTN | No. 17 | Michigan State | W 70–65 | 13–3 (4–1) | Value City Arena (7,601); Columbus, OH |
| January 17, 2024; 7:00 p.m., Peacock | No. 18 | at Maryland | W 84–76 | 14–3 (5–1) | Xfinity Center (5,112); College Park, MD |
| January 21, 2024; 12:00 p.m., NBC | No. 18 | No. 2 Iowa | W 100–92 ^{OT} | 15–3 (6–1) | Value City Arena (18,660); Columbus, OH |
| January 25, 2024; 7:00 p.m., Peacock | No. 12 | at Illinois | W 67–59 | 16–3 (7–1) | State Farm Center (3,254); Champaign, IL |
| January 28, 2024; 2:00 p.m., B1G+ | No. 12 | at Purdue | W 71–68 | 17–3 (8–1) | Mackey Arena (7,132); West Lafayette, IN |
| February 1, 2024; 6:00 p.m., BTN | No. 8 | Wisconsin | W 87–49 | 18–3 (9–1) | Value City Arena (6,672); Columbus, OH |
| February 4, 2024; 12:00 p.m., FS1 | No. 8 | No. 10 Indiana | W 74–69 | 19–3 (10–1) | Value City Arena (10,130); Columbus, OH |
| February 8, 2024; 9:00 p.m., Peacock | No. 5 | at Minnesota | W 71–47 | 20–3 (11–1) | Williams Arena (3,572); Minneapolis, MN |
| February 11, 2024; 4:00 p.m., Peacock | No. 5 | at Michigan State | W 86–71 | 21–3 (12–1) | Breslin Student Events Center (5,753); East Lansing, MI |
| February 14, 2024; 7:00 p.m., Peacock | No. 2 | Nebraska | W 80–47 | 22–3 (13–1) | Value City Arena (7,115); Columbus, OH |
| February 22, 2024; 6:00 p.m., BTN | No. 2 | at Penn State; Return to Rec | W 82–69 | 23–3 (14–1) | Rec Hall (2,501); University Park, PA |
| February 25, 2024; 2:00 p.m., BTN | No. 2 | Maryland | W 79–66 | 24–3 (15–1) | Value City Arena (10,790); Columbus, OH |
| February 28, 2024; 7:00 p.m., Peacock | No. 2 | Michigan; Rivalry | W 67–51 | 25–3 (16–1) | Value City Arena (10,895); Columbus, OH |
| March 3, 2024; 1:00 p.m., Fox | No. 2 | at No. 6 Iowa; College GameDay | L 83–93 | 25–4 (16–2) | Carver–Hawkeye Arena (14,998); Iowa City, IA |
Big Ten Women's Tournament
| March 8, 2024; 12:30 p.m., BTN | (1) No. 4 | vs. (8) Maryland; Quarterfinals | L 61–82 | 25–5 | Target Center; Minneapolis, MN |
NCAA Women's Tournament
| March 22, 2024*; 12:00 p.m., ESPN | (2 P3) No. 7 | (15 P3) Maine; First round | W 80–57 | 26–5 | Value City Arena; Columbus, OH |
| March 24, 2024*; 12:00 p.m., ESPN | (2 P3) No. 7 | (7 P3) Duke; Second round | L 63–75 | 26–6 | Value City Arena (8,333); Columbus, OH |
*Non-conference game. ^{#}Rankings from AP Poll. (#) Tournament seedings in parentheses. P3=Portland 3. All times are in Eastern. Source:

== Rankings ==
Ranking movements Legend: ██ Increase in ranking ██ Decrease in ranking т = Tied with team above or below
| | Week | | | | | | | | | | | | | | | | | | | | |
| Poll | Pre | 1 | 2 | 3 | 4 | 5 | 6 | 7 | 8 | 9 | 10 | 11 | 12 | 13 | 14 | 15 | 16 | 17 | 18 | 19 | Final |
|---|---|---|---|---|---|---|---|---|---|---|---|---|---|---|---|---|---|---|---|---|---|
| AP | 7 | 13 | 15 | 16 | 12 | 12т | 13 | 17 | 20 | 17 | 18 | 12 | 8 | 5 | 2 | 2 | 2 | 4 | 7 | 7 | 16 |
| Coaches | 6 | 10т | 12 | 13 | 11 | 11 | 13 | 13 | 18 | 16 | 15 | 12 | 7 | 5 | 2 | 2 | 2 | 4 | 9 | 9 | 14 |
