= 2023–24 Big Ten Conference women's basketball season =

- League: NCAA Division I
- Sport: Basketball
- Teams: 14
- TV partner(s): Big Ten Network, Fox, FS1, Peacock

2023–24 NCAA Division I women's basketball season
- Regular-season champions: Ohio State
- Season MVP: Caitlin Clark, Iowa

Tournament
- Champions: Iowa
- Runners-up: Nebraska
- Finals MVP: Caitlin Clark, Iowa

Basketball seasons
- 2022–23 2024–25

2023–24 Big Ten women's basketball standings
	Conf.				Overall
Team	W		L	PCT	W		L	PCT
No. 16 Ohio State	16	–	2	.889	26	–	6	.813
No. 2 Iowa †	15	–	3	.833	34	–	5	.872
No. 12 Indiana	15	–	3	.833	26	–	6	.813
Michigan State	12	–	6	.667	22	–	9	.710
Nebraska	11	–	7	.611	23	–	12	.657
Michigan	9	–	9	.500	20	–	14	.588
Penn State	9	–	9	.500	22	–	13	.629
Maryland	9	–	9	.500	19	–	14	.576
Illinois	8	–	10	.444	19	–	15	.559
Wisconsin	6	–	12	.333	15	–	17	.469
Minnesota	5	–	13	.278	20	–	16	.556
Purdue	5	–	13	.278	15	–	19	.441
Northwestern	4	–	14	.222	9	–	21	.300
Rutgers	2	–	16	.111	8	–	24	.250
† 2024 Big Ten tournament winner Rankings from AP Poll

The 2023–24 Big Ten women's basketball season began with practices in October 2023, followed by the start of the 2023–24 NCAA Division I women's basketball season in November 2023. The regular season ended in March 2024.

This was the last season played with 14 teams in the conference, with four schools joining the following year. This was the first season played under the Big Ten's new seven-year media rights deal. As a result, no conference games aired on ESPN and some games were streamed by Peacock for the first time.

== Head coaches ==
=== Coaching changes prior to the season ===
==== Michigan State ====
On March 31, 2023, Robyn Fralick was named the sixth head coach of Michigan State.

==== Minnesota ====
On March 18, 2023, Dawn Plitzuweit was named the 13th head coach of Minnesota.

=== Coaches ===
Team	Head coach	Previous job	Years at school	Overall record	Big Ten record	Big Ten titles	Big Ten Tournament titles	NCAA Tournaments	NCAA Final Fours	NCAA Championships
Illinois	Shauna Green	Dayton	2	22–10	11–7	0	0	1	0	0
Indiana	Teri Moren	Indiana State	10	200–93	99–57	1	0	5	0	0
Iowa	Lisa Bluder	Drake	24	494–246	247–142	2	4	17	1	0
Maryland	Brenda Frese	Minnesota	22	563–146	137–20*	6	5	19	3	1
Michigan	Kim Barnes Arico	St. John's (Asst.)	12	241–119	109–75	0	0	6	0	0
Michigan State	Robyn Fralick	Bowling Green	1	0–0	0–0	0	0	0	0	0
Minnesota	Dawn Plitzuweit	West Virginia	1	0–0	0–0	0	0	0	0	0
Nebraska	Amy Williams	South Dakota	8	110–95	58–65	0	0	2	0	0
Northwestern	Joe McKeown	George Washington	16	250–219	104–152	0	0	2	0	0
Ohio State	Kevin McGuff	Washington	11	172–97	87–55	3	1	6	0	0
Penn State	Carolyn Kieger	Marquette	3	41–73	16–57	0	0	0	0	0
Purdue	Katie Gearlds	Marian	3	36–26	16–19	0	0	1	0	0
Rutgers	Coquese Washington	Notre Dame (Assoc.)	2	12–20	5–13	0	0	0	0	0
Wisconsin	Marisa Moseley	Boston University	3	19–40	11–25	0	0	0	0	0

Notes:

- All records, appearances, titles, etc. are from time with current school only.
- Year at school includes 2023–24 season.
- Overall and Big Ten records are from time at current school and are through the beginning of the season.
- Frese's ACC conference record excluded since Maryland began Big Ten Conference play in 2014–15.

== Preseason ==
=== Preseason Big Ten poll ===
Prior to the conference's annual media day, conference standings were projected by a panel of writers.

Rank	Team
1	Iowa
2	Indiana
3	Ohio State
4	Maryland
5	Michigan

=== Preseason All-Big Ten ===
A select media panel named a preseason All-Big Ten team and player of the year.

Honor	Recipient
Preseason Player of the Year	Caitlin Clark, Iowa
Preseason All-Big Ten Team	Makira Cook, Illinois
Preseason All-Big Ten Team	Mackenzie Holmes, Indiana
Preseason All-Big Ten Team	Caitlin Clark, Iowa
Preseason All-Big Ten Team	Shyanne Sellers, Maryland
Preseason All-Big Ten Team	Laila Phelia, Michigan
Preseason All-Big Ten Team	Alexis Markowski, Nebraska
Preseason All-Big Ten Team	Jaz Shelley, Nebraska
Preseason All-Big Ten Team	Cotie McMahon, Ohio State
Preseason All-Big Ten Team	Jacy Sheldon, Ohio State
Preseason All-Big Ten Team	Makenna Marisa, Penn State

== Awards and honors ==
=== Players of the Week ===
Throughout the conference regular season, Big Ten Conference offices named two players (Player and Freshman) of the week each Monday.

Week	Player of the Week	School	Ref.	Freshman of the Week	School	Ref.
Nov. 13	Caitlin Clark	Iowa		Natalie Potts	Nebraska	
Nov. 20	Sara Scalia	Indiana		Rashunda Jones	Purdue	
Nov. 27	Caitlin Clark (2)	Iowa		Natalie Potts (2)	Nebraska	
Dec. 4	Celeste Taylor	Ohio State		Grace Grocholski	Minnesota	

School	PoW	FoW	Total
Iowa	2	—	2
Nebraska	—	2	2
Indiana	1	—	1
Minnesota	—	1	1
Ohio State	1	—	1
Purdue	—	1	1

=== All-Big Ten awards and teams ===
On March 5, 2024, the Big Ten announced its conference awards.

Honor	Coaches	Media
Player of the Year	Caitlin Clark, Iowa	Caitlin Clark, Iowa
Coach of the Year	Kevin McGuff, Ohio State	Kevin McGuff, Ohio State
Freshman of the Year	Natalie Potts, Nebraska	Mary Ashley Stevenson, Purdue
Defensive Player of the Year	Celeste Taylor, Ohio State	Serah Williams, Wisconsin
Sixth Player of the Year	Theryn Hallock, Michigan State	Theryn Hallock, Michigan State
All-Big Ten First Team	Julia Ayrault, Michigan State	Julia Ayrault, Michigan State
All-Big Ten First Team	Caitlin Clark, Iowa	Caitlin Clark, Iowa
All-Big Ten First Team	Mackenzie Holmes, Indiana	Mackenzie Holmes, Indiana
All-Big Ten First Team	Alexis Markowski, Nebraska	Alexis Markowski, Nebraska
All-Big Ten First Team	Cotie McMahon, Ohio State	Cotie McMahon, Ohio State
All-Big Ten First Team	Laila Phelia, Michigan	Laila Phelia, Michigan
All-Big Ten First Team	Sara Scalia, Indiana	Sara Scalia, Indiana
All-Big Ten First Team	Shyanne Sellers	Shyanne Sellers
All-Big Ten First Team	Jacy Sheldon, Ohio State	Jacy Sheldon, Ohio State
All-Big Ten First Team	Serah Williams, Wisconsin	Serah Williams, Wisconsin
All-Big Ten Second Team*	Destiny Adams, Rutgers	Kendall Bostic, Illinois
All-Big Ten Second Team*	Jakia Brown-Turner, Maryland	Makira Cook, Illinois
All-Big Ten Second Team*	Makira Cook, Illinois	Moira Joiner, Michigan State
All-Big Ten Second Team*	DeeDee Hagemann, Michigan State	Makenna Marisa, Penn State
All-Big Ten Second Team*	Moira Joiner, Michigan State	Kate Martin, Iowa
All-Big Ten Second Team*	Kate Martin, Iowa	Chloe Moore-McNeil, Indiana
All-Big Ten Second Team*	Chloe Moore-McNeil, Indiana	Jaz Shelley, Nebraska
All-Big Ten Second Team*	Ashley Owusu, Penn State	Hannah Stuelke, Iowa
All-Big Ten Second Team*	Jaz Shelley, Nebraska	Celeste Taylor, Ohio State
All-Big Ten Second Team*	Hannah Stuelke, Iowa	Taylor Thierry, Ohio State
All-Big Ten Second Team*	Celeste Taylor, Ohio State	Not Selected (Note: The coaches' All-Big Ten Second Team had 12 members due to a tie in voting.)
All-Big Ten Second Team*	Taylor Thierry, Ohio State	Not Selected
All-Freshman Team	Mary Ashley Stevenson, Purdue	Mary Ashley Stevenson, Purdue
All-Freshman Team	Gretchen Dolan, Illinois	Grace Grocholski, Minnesota
All-Freshman Team	Grace Grocholski, Minnesota	Rashunda Jones, Purdue
All-Freshman Team	Logan Nissley, Nebraska	Logan Nissley, Nebraska
All-Freshman Team	Natalie Potts, Nebraska	Natalie Potts, Nebraska
All-Defensive Team	Mackenzie Holmes, Indiana	Mackenzie Holmes, Indiana
All-Defensive Team	Leilani Kapinus, Penn State	Leilani Kapinus, Penn State
All-Defensive Team	Chloe Moore-McNeil, Indiana	Jacy Sheldon, Ohio State
All-Defensive Team	Celeste Taylor, Ohio State	Celeste Taylor, Ohio State
All-Defensive Team	Serah Williams, Wisconsin	Serah Williams, Wisconsin

== Postseason ==
=== Big Ten tournament ===
First round Wednesday, March 6 Peacock
12	Purdue	78
13	Northwestern	72
11	Minnesota	77
14	Rutgers	69

Second round Thursday, March 7 BTN
8	Maryland	75
9	Illinois	65
5	Nebraska	64
12	Purdue	56
7	Penn State	80
10	Wisconsin	56
6	Michigan	76
11	Minnesota	57

Quarterfinals; Friday, March 8 BTN
1	Ohio State	61
8	Maryland	82
4	Michigan State	61
5	Nebraska	73
2	Iowa	95
7	Penn State	62
3	Indiana	56
6	Michigan	69

Semifinals; Saturday, March 9 BTN
8	Maryland	68
5	Nebraska	78
2	Iowa	95
6	Michigan	68

Championship; Sunday, March 10; CBS
5	Nebraska	89
2	Iowa	94*

* denotes overtime period

=== NCAA tournament ===
Seed	Region	School	First round	Second round	Sweet Sixteen	Elite Eight	Final Four	Championship
1	A2	Iowa	W 91–65 vs. (16) Holy Cross	W 64–54 vs. (8) West Virginia	W 89–68 vs. (5) Colorado	W 94–87 vs. (3) LSU	W 71–69 vs. (3) UConn	L 75–87 vs. (1) South Carolina
2	P3	Ohio State	W 80–57 vs. (15) Maine	L 63–75 vs. (7) Duke	DNP			
4	A1	Indiana	W 89–56 vs. (13) Fairffield	W 75–68 vs. (5) Oklahoma	L 75–79 vs. (1) South Carolina	DNP		
6	A1	Nebraska	W 61–59 vs. (11) Texas A&M	L 51–61 vs. (3) Oregon State	DNP			
9	A1	Michigan State	L 56–59 vs. (8) North Carolina	DNP				
9	P3	Michigan	L 72–81^{(OT)} vs. (8) Kansas	DNP				
10	P4	Maryland	L 86–93 vs. (7) Iowa State	DNP				
W–L (%):			4–3 (.571)	2–2 (.500)	1–1 (.500)	1–0 (1.000)	1–0 (1.000)	0–1 (.000)
Total: 9–7 (.563)

=== WBIT tournament ===
Seed	Bracket	School	First round	Second round	Third round	Semifinals	Final
1	4	Penn State	W 84–80^{(OT)} vs. (–) George Mason	W 74–66 vs. (–) Belmont	W 92–87 vs. (2) Mississippi State	L 53–58 vs. (1) Villinova	DNP
4	1	Illinois	W 74–69 vs. (–) Missouri State	W 79–62 vs. (–) Stony Brook	W 69–61 vs. (3) Tulsa	W 81–58 vs. (1) Washington State	W 71–57 vs. (1) Villanova
W–L (%):			2–0 (1.000)	2–0 (1.000)	2–0 (1.000)	1–1 (.500)	1–0 (1.000)
Total: 8–1 (.889)

=== WNIT tournament ===
School	Round 1	Round 2	Super 16	Great 8	Semifinals	Championshiip
Wisconsin	bye	W 67–62 vs. Southern Indiana	W 86–61 vs. Illinois State	L 60–65 vs. Saint Louis	DNP	
Minnesota	bye	W 77–62 vs. Pacific	W 69–65 vs. North Dakota State	W 65–54 vs. Wyoming	W 74–69 vs. Troy	L 50–69 vs. Saint Louis
Purdue	bye	W 62–51 vs. Butler	W 71–50 vs. Duquesne	L 59–67 vs. Vermont	DNP	
W–L (%):	0–0 (–)	3–0 (1.000)	3–0 (1.000)	1–2 (.333)	1–0 (1.000)	0–1 (.000)
Total: 8–3 (.727)
