= Wohl (surname) =

Wohl is a German and Ashkenazi Jewish surname of multiple possible origins. Notable people with the surname include:

- Aleksandar Wohl (born 1963), Australian chess player
- Alfred Wohl (1863–1939), German chemist
- Brian Wohl (born 1972), known by his ring name Julio Dinero, American professional wrestler
- Cecília Wohl (1862–1939), Hungarian philanthropist
- Daniel Wohl (born 1980), French composer
- David A. Wohl, American infectious disease physician.
- Dave Wohl (born 1949), American basketball player and coach.
- David Wohl (born 1967), American comic book author and editor.
- David Wohl (actor) (born 1953), American actor.
- David E. Wohl (born 1961), American criminal defense attorney and pundit.
- Eddie Wohl, American record producer and member of rock music ensemble World Fire Brigade
- Ellen Wohl (born 1962), American fluvial geomorphologist
- Herman Wohl (1877–1936), American composer
- Ira Wohl, American documentary filmmaker
- Jacob Wohl (born 1997), American far-right conspiracy theorist, fraudster, and Internet troll
- Jeanette Wohl (1783–1861), German correspondent and heir of Ludwig Börne
- Louis de Wohl (1903–1961), Hungarian astrologer and writer
- Martin Wohl (died 2009), American transportation economist
- Mary Ellen Wohl (1932–2009), American pulmonologist
- Maurice Wohl (1923–2007), British philanthropist
- Paul Wohl (1901–1985), German journalist and political commentator
- Richard Wohl (1921–1957), American sociologist
- Stanisław Wohl (1912–1985), Film director screenwriter and cinematographer
