= Wohl =

Wohl may refer to:

- Wohl (surname)
- Wohl Centre, at Bar-Ilan University in Ramat Gan, Israel
- Wohl degradation
- Wohl equation
- Wohl model (disambiguation)
- WOHL, Western Ontario Hockey League, an ice hockey league that existed from 1969 to 2007
- WOHL-CD, a television station (channel 15, virtual channel 35) licensed to serve Lima, Ohio, United States
