= David Wohl (disambiguation) =

David or Dave Wohl may refer to the following persons:

- David A. Wohl, American infectious disease physician
- Dave Wohl (born 1949), American basketball player and coach
- David Wohl (born 1967), American comic book author and editor
- David Wohl (actor) (born 1953), American actor
