= Tamara Broderick =

American computer scientist

- Born: Tamara Ann Broderick
- Education: Princeton University (BS); University of Cambridge (MAS); University of California, Berkeley (PhD)
- Awards: National Science Foundation CAREER Award
- Scientific career
- Fields: Machine Learning; Statistics; Bayesian Inference
- Workplaces: Massachusetts Institute of Technology
- Thesis: Clusters and features from combinatorial stochastic processes (2014)
- Doctoral advisor: Michael I. Jordan
- Website: tamarabroderick.com

Tamara Ann Broderick is an American computer scientist at the Massachusetts Institute of Technology. She works on machine learning and Bayesian inference.

== Education and early career ==
Broderick is from Parma Heights, Ohio. She attended Laurel School and graduated in 2003. Whilst at high school she took part in the inaugural Massachusetts Institute of Technology Women's Technology Program. She studied mathematics at Princeton University, earning a bachelor's degree in 2007. She was a Marshall scholar, allowing her to pursue graduate research at the University of Cambridge. She was a runner-up in the Association for Women in Mathematics Alice T. Shafer Prize for Excellence in Mathematics. She was co-president of the Princeton Math Club and organised a competition for high school maths teams. She won the Phi Beta Kappa Prize for the highest academic average at Princeton University. During her undergraduate degree, Broderick worked on dark matter haloes with Rachel Mandelbaum. Broderick moved to the United Kingdom for her graduate studies, earning a Master of Advanced Studies for completing Part III of the Mathematical Tripos at the University of Cambridge in 2009. Her Master's thesis looked at the Nomon selection method, improving the efficiency of communications. She returned to America in 2009, joining University of California, Berkeley for her Master's and PhD. Her graduate research was supported by the Berkeley Fellowship and a National Science Foundation Fellowship. Her PhD thesis Clusters and features from combinatorial stochastic processes looked at clustering and speeding up the analysis of large, streaming data sets. In 2013 she was selected for the Berkeley EECS Rising Stars conference.

== Research and career ==
Broderick joined Massachusetts Institute of Technology as an assistant professor in 2015. She is interested in Bayesian statistics and graphical models. She was the recipient of a Google Faculty Research Grant and International Society for Bayesian Analysis Lifetime Members Junior Researcher Award. She was awarded an Army Research Office young investigator program award to investigate machine-learning to quantify uncertainty in data analysis. Broderick is also Alfred P. Sloan Foundation scholar.

=== Academic service ===
In 2018, Broderick spoke at the Harvard University Institute for Applied Computational Science Women in Data Science conference. She spoke about Bayesian inference at the 2018 International Conference on Machine Learning. She led a three-day Masterclass on machine learning at University College London in June 2018. Broderick is a scientific advisor for AI.Reverie and WiML (Women in Machine Learning). She has developed a high-school level introduction to machine learning with the Women's Technology Program (WTP). Software she has developed is available on her website.

=== Awards and honors ===
Broderick was awarded the Evelyn Fix Memorial Medal and Citation and the International Society for Bayesian Analysis Savage Award for her doctoral thesis. She was awarded a National Science Foundation CAREER Award to scale her machine learning techniques. She was a 2021 Leadership Academy winner of the Committee of Presidents of Statistical Societies.
