= Josephine Herrick =

American photographer, humanitarian, entrepreneur and teacher

Josephine Ursula Herrick
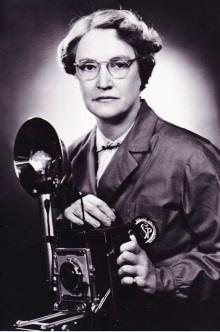
- Born: August 1, 1897; Cleveland, Ohio, US
- Died: March 27, 1972 (aged 74); New York City, US
- Education: Laurel School; Women's College of Western Reserve University; Clarence H. White School of Photography
- Occupations: Photographer, entrepreneur, humanitarian, teacher
- Known for: Founding the Josephine Herrick Project; disability rights pioneer, commercial and fine art photography

Josephine Ursula Herrick (August 1, 1897 – March 27, 1972) was an American photographer, humanitarian, entrepreneur and teacher.

During World War II, she pioneered the teaching of photography to wounded war veterans for the purpose of helping them heal their physical and emotional wounds and re-engage with the world. Building on that work, she founded and led arts-based charity the Josephine Herrick Project, that is based in New York City and still teaches photography to veterans, the disabled and other underserved populations.

Herrick also served during World War II as a photographer on the United States' Manhattan Project,which developed the atomic bomb.

Professionally, Herrick was a successful commercial photographer, studio owner and photography instructor. As a fine art photographer, she won a number of awards and her work was exhibited in various publications and venues.

== Early life ==
Herrick was born in Cleveland, Ohio, in 1897. Her father, Frank Herrick, was a graduate of Yale, a prominent attorney in Cleveland and a law professor. Her mother, Josephine Pomeroy Herrick, was an inventor and the holder of patents for several mechanical devices. After graduating from the Laurel School, Herrick worked as a Red Cross nurse in Cleveland during World War I. She attended Bryn Mawr College and graduated from Western Reserve University in 1920.

=== Family ===
Herrick's paternal lineage can be traced back to one of the oldest families settled in Massachusetts that fought in the colonial army during the American Revolution. Her great-great-grandfather, Frances Herrick, commanded a regiment during the War of 1812 and was a large landowner and leading citizen of Lorain County, Ohio. Her grandfather, Gamaliel Herrick, served as President of the Cleveland Linseed Oil Company and a director in the East Cleveland Railroad Company. Her cousin, Myron T. Herrick, served as governor of Ohio and as U.S. ambassador to France during the early 20th century.

Her maternal grandfather was Theodore M. Pomeroy, a businessman, lawyer and member of the U.S. House of Representatives from New York State during the American Civil War.

== Photography career ==
=== Mentorship with Clarence White ===
After college, Herrick studied photography at the Clarence H. White School of Photography in New York City in the early 1920s. Clarence Hudson White was a self-taught photographer who greatly influenced the course of photography in the early 20th century as a teacher and mentor. A number of his students went on to prominent and influential careers of their own including Margaret Bourke-White, Paul Outerbridge, Dorothea Lange and Anton Bruehl. Herrick graduated from the Clarence White School in 1924. According to Bonnie Yochelson, an authority on Clarence White:

[White’s] pedagogic philosophy was grounded in the arts-and-crafts movement, which sought to bring beauty into the lives of all people, and in the progressive ideals of John Dewey, who encouraged each student to find his own way. In this sense, Josephine Herrick's career presents a characteristic outcome of White's teaching. Like White, she found her calling in using photography to better the lives of others.

Beginning in 1924 and continuing into the late 1930s, Herrick submitted photographs to the Cleveland Museum of Art’s May Show, an annual juried exhibition of the works of northeastern Ohio artists. She won several prizes including First Prize in 1927 for her photograph of an infant entitled "Yes".

=== New York studio ===
In 1928, Herrick joined with Princess Miguel de Braganza to open a photography studio in New York City, specializing in portraits, landscapes and interiors. An exhibit of their portraits was presented in Newport, Rhode Island in 1934. The studio operated until 1941.

=== World War II ===
At the start of World War II, Herrick was a commercial and fine art photographer in New York City and her nephews were Cleveland schoolboys. Five years later, one of her nephew's fighter jet had been shot down over Germany and he had been taken prisoner of war. Herrick herself had worked on the Manhattan Project that built the world's first atomic bomb and had started an innovative project that taught photography to thousands of wounded veterans and to many others in need, as a form of rehabilitation and artistic affirmation.

Herrick's brother, Sherlock, and two of her nephews served overseas in the theaters of Africa and Europe during World War II. Her nephew Theodore Herrick flew as a B-17 navigator in a 1944 air attack on an I.G. Farben oil refinery, a heavily defended German strategic resource. His plane was shot down with five of the men on board killed and the other four, including Theodore Herrick, taken prisoner. Theodore survived and resumed his life after the war.

In her early support of the war effort, Herrick volunteered for the American Women's Voluntary Services in 1941. As she later recalled:

Those were the war years! There was a great desire to volunteer, to serve, to assist the war effort in any way one could. In 1941 I volunteered to A.W.V.S – American Women’s Voluntary Services – in the field of my own profession, education, training and experience – photography. This led to my starting on September 16, 1941, to teach the first training course, then called "Defense Photography", for the Tenth Division of A.W.V.S Photography COULD play a very important role. Volunteers were vital – - but – trained in a specific field, they could, naturally, perform the greatest service. We took the name "War Service Photography" and became the War Service Photography Division of A.W.V.S. Greater New York and National. Our membership grew quickly. We were drawn together through the common bond of photography and the desire to serve.

During the first part of the war, Herrick and the War Service Photography (W.S.P.) division trained volunteer photographers and led the effort to use photographs to maintain the connection among families separated by the war. W.S.P. volunteers photographed servicemen in lunch canteens and U.S.O. facilities and printed the photographs. "The boys send them home to their mothers, wives and girls with a letter of greeting from the A.W.V.S."

As the war continued, large number of wounded veterans returned to the U.S. and filled the veterans’ hospitals. In response, and impelled by converging advances in medicine, psychology and public policy, arts-based rehabilitation programs were established in the veterans’ hospitals. One leader in this area was Dr. Howard Rusk, a Missouri physician who enlisted in the Air Force early in the war. His efforts led to the creation in early 1944 of the U.S. Army Air Force Convalescent Training Center in Pawling, New York. Veterans were offered a wide variety of activities. Photographers from Herrick's W.S.P. team taught photography at the Pawling center.

In recognition of the value of these programs, the Surgeon General of the United States Navy formalized and expanded the photography program for veterans in May 1944. The first two photography programs for Navy veterans opened at St. Albans Naval Hospital in Queens, New York, and the Bethesda Naval Hospital in Maryland. Herrick led the programs for W.S.P. and took many photographs herself.

==== Development of the atomic bomb ====
World War II ended with the dropping of atomic bombs on Japan in August 1945. An August 25 article quoted Herrick as saying "now it can be told." She and her W.S.P. colleague Mary Steers had worked on the development of the atomic bomb as a part of the Manhattan Project based in Oak Ridge, Tennessee.

=== 1940s after the war ===
The demand for photography programs for veterans surged after World War II ended. By the end of 1946, Herrick informed the Surgeon General of the War Department that photography programs had been provided in 19 different Army, Navy and Veterans hospitals. Technical ingenuity extended the reach of the programs to the bedside of immobilized veterans. A woman contributor at Walter Reed Army Medical Center in Washington imagined a compact and movable darkroom. She made some rough sketches and a volunteer architect drew up plans and blueprints. Then Herrick had the portable darkroom constructed in the prevocational shop at St. Albans Naval Hospital.

In 1946, Herrick and her fellow photographers incorporated as a peacetime charity named Volunteer Service Photographers.

An article published by Dr. Howard Rusk during that period acknowledged the contributions of the Volunteer Service Photographers organization and noted that "the group, headed by Josephine U. Herrick, a noted photographer, is planning an ambitious expansion." He then quoted Herrick:

"Our five years’ experience during the war in military hospitals has demonstrated how photography can fill the need for a stimulating, even exciting, activity which relieves the monotony of hospital life. We are firmly convinced that it not only helps men get well, but gives them an enjoyable hobby they can continue when they leave the hospital. We hope it can be carried on in every military and veterans’ hospital in the country."

Later in the decade, Herrick authored a book entitled Outline for Training Course in Hospital Rehabilitation Photography.

=== 1950s and 1960s ===
In the 1950s and 1960s, Herrick continued her work for VSP as it extended its reach into a wider range of settings including schools, inner city youth centers, senior citizen residences, substance abuse recovery centers and elsewhere. Her passion and commitment are apparent in a letter she wrote in 1959 about one of VSP's disabled students who had won a prize in the organization's annual contest:

It is very inspiring to discover the stories connected with the patients who win the prizes. So many times all of their work may have been done from wheelchairs and on stretchers or, in some cases with photo-oil-coloring, the winners may have performed their photo-oil-coloring under the very greatest of handicaps. Thinking of just one instance, years ago we discovered that a prize-winner was a polio patient, unable to use hands and arms, and held the tufts of cotton on sticks in her teeth to do the photo-oil-coloring.

Herrick also joined with Margaret Bourke-White to help publicize the good work of VSP through several appearances on popular radio shows of the day including WNBC, WCBS, WMCA and WRCA.

=== Teaching ===
In the decades after the war, Herrick also devoted herself to her work as a photography teacher and artist. In addition to individual instruction, she taught photography courses at the New York Institute of Photography, the School of Modern Photography, New York University, Y.W.C.A. and the Germain School. She also taught courses and photographed for many summers at the Chautauqua Institute in upstate New York. During this period, her travel, landscape and portrait photographs were exhibited in New York City and at Chautauqua. An exhibition of her photographs was presented at the New York Public Library in 1959. The exhibition featured photographs from Chautauqua, from a recent trip to England, Scotland and Wales, from New York City landmarks and from the gardens of Florida.

== Personal life ==
Little is known about Herrick's personal life. She lived for many years on East 73rd Street in New York City. She never married and her obituary said she left no immediate survivors.
