= Claude Beck =

American cardiac surgeon and professor of cardiovascular surgery

Claude Schaeffer Beck
- Born: November 8, 1894; Shamokin, Pennsylvania
- Died: October 14, 1971 (aged 76)
- Citizenship: United States
- Occupation: Cardiac surgeon
- Known for: First defibrillation in 1947

Claude Schaeffer Beck (November 8, 1894 – October 14, 1971) was a pioneer cardiac surgeon, famous for innovating various cardiac surgery techniques, and performing the first defibrillation in 1947. He was the first American professor of cardiovascular surgery, from 1952 through 1965. He was a nominee for the Nobel Prize in Medicine in 1952.

== Early life and education ==
Beck was born on November 8, 1894, in Shamokin, Pennsylvania. He attended undergraduate school at Franklin & Marshall College in Lancaster, Pennsylvania. He received his medical degree in 1921 from Johns Hopkins. He then pursued general surgery training at Yale University's New Haven Hospital. From 1923 to 1924, he served as the Arthur Tracy Cabot Fellow in Surgical Research at Harvard University under the guidance of Dr. Harvey Cushing. At the same time, he was also an associate surgeon at the Peter Bent Brigham Hospital where he worked with Dr. Elliott Cutler. In 1924, Cutler moved to Lakeside Hospital of Case Western Reserve University and Beck moved with him where he became the first Crile Research Fellow in Surgery. Beck was a resident surgeon at Lakeside Hospital from 1926 to 1927 and an instructor at Case Western from 1925 to 1928 where he rose through the ranks and became an assistant professor in 1928 and an associate professor of surgery in 1933. In 1940, Beck became a tenured professor in neurosurgery, and in 1952 he received the title of professor of cardiovascular surgery. Finally, in 1965 he was named professor emeritus. Beck stayed at Case Western until his death in 1971.

== Career ==
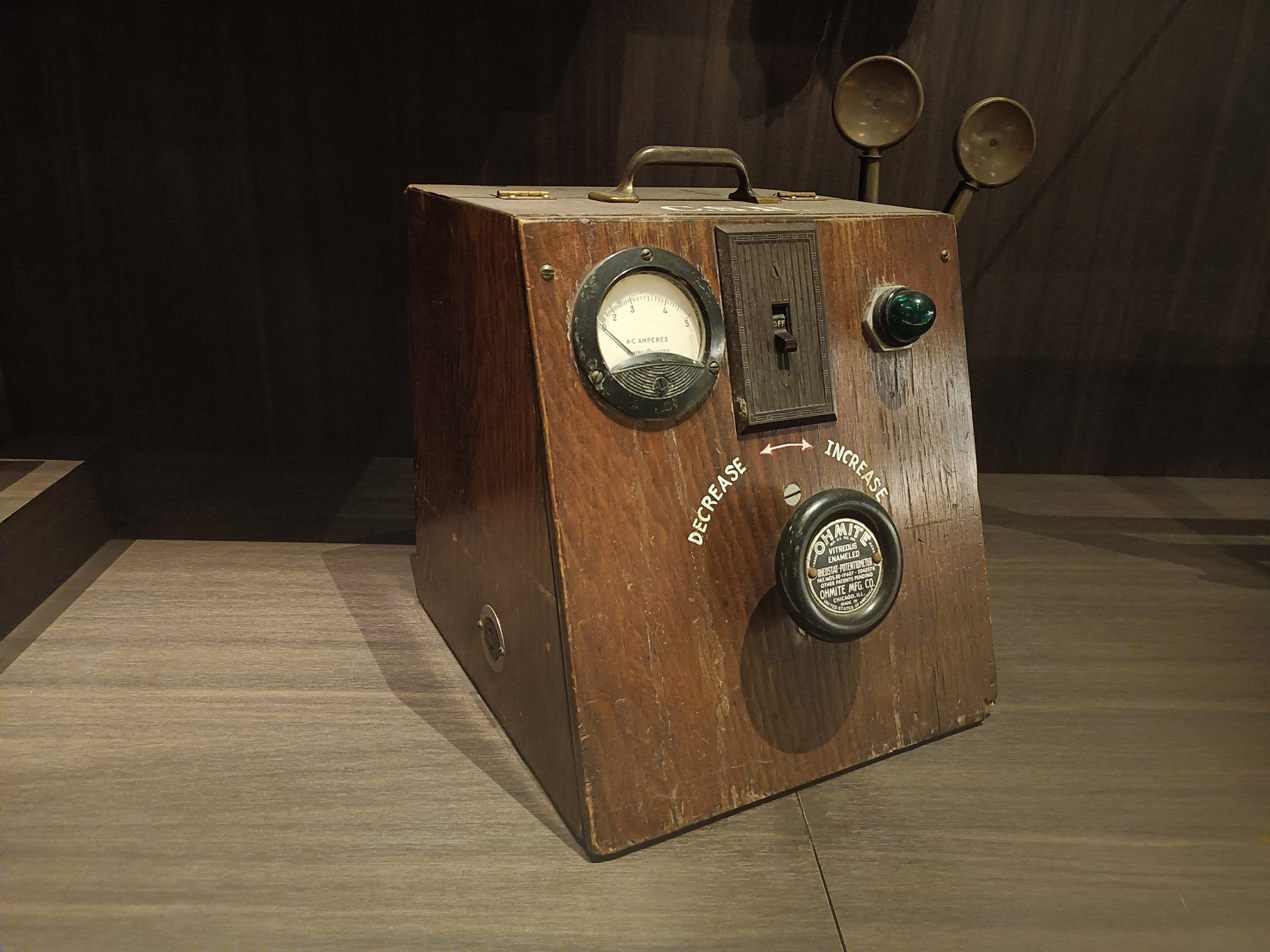
Beck's prototype defibrillator (1947) in the collection of the National Museum of American History.

In the 1930s, Beck worked on the problem of how to restore circulation to the heart, by developing a technique to implant some pectoral muscle into the pericardium, which provided an additional source of circulation. The technique received great acclaim at the time, though it was eventually replaced with more modern techniques.

He performed the first "Beck I" operation (cardiopericardiopexy) in 1935. The Beck II operation came about in the late 1940s, which created a vein graft between the aorta and coronary sinus.

In 1947, he performed the first successful defibrillation. He had been operating on a 14-year-old boy with a congenital disorder, but towards the end of the surgery as the boy's chest was being closed, the boy went into cardiac arrest. Beck reopened the chest and tried to massage the heart by hand for approximately 45 minutes, before proceeding to the use of defibrillator which had been designed by Beck and built by his friend James Rand (of the Rand Development Corp.). Beck applied the paddles of the device directly to the boy's heart, and successfully brought the heart out of fibrillation. The boy made a full recovery.

Beck is also credited with describing the physiological basis for the signs of acute cardiac tamponade. The medical signs classically associated with acute cardiac tamponade are collectively called Beck's triad.

== Personal life and death ==
His daughter, Mary Ellen Wohl, became chief of the respiratory diseases division at Children's Hospital Boston, amongst other accomplishments.

He retired in 1965, and died of a stroke in 1971.

== Publications ==
- "Two cardiac compression triads", Journal of the American Medical Association, 1935
- "Ventricular fibrillation of long duration abolished by electric shock", JAMA, 1947
- "The development of a new blood supply to the heart by operation", Annals of Surgery, 1935
