= 2023–24 Indiana Hoosiers women's basketball team =

American college basketball season

2023–24 Indiana Hoosiers women's basketball

Fort Myers Tip-Off Island Division champions

NCAA tournament, Sweet Sixteen
- Conference: Big Ten Conference

Ranking
- Coaches: No. 12
- AP: No. 12
- Record: 26–6 (15–3 Big Ten)
- Head coach: Teri Moren (10th season)
- Assistant coaches: Rhet Wierzba; Linda Sayavongchanh; Amber Smith
- Home arena: Simon Skjodt Assembly Hall

2023–24 Big Ten women's basketball standings
	Conf.				Overall
Team	W		L	PCT	W		L	PCT
No. 16 Ohio State	16	–	2	.889	26	–	6	.813
No. 2 Iowa †	15	–	3	.833	34	–	5	.872
No. 12 Indiana	15	–	3	.833	26	–	6	.813
Michigan State	12	–	6	.667	22	–	9	.710
Nebraska	11	–	7	.611	23	–	12	.657
Michigan	9	–	9	.500	20	–	14	.588
Penn State	9	–	9	.500	22	–	13	.629
Maryland	9	–	9	.500	19	–	14	.576
Illinois	8	–	10	.444	19	–	15	.559
Wisconsin	6	–	12	.333	15	–	17	.469
Minnesota	5	–	13	.278	20	–	16	.556
Purdue	5	–	13	.278	15	–	19	.441
Northwestern	4	–	14	.222	9	–	21	.300
Rutgers	2	–	16	.111	8	–	24	.250
† 2024 Big Ten tournament winner Rankings from AP Poll

The 2023–24 Indiana Hoosiers women's basketball team represented Indiana University Bloomington during the 2023–24 NCAA Division I women's basketball season. The Hoosiers were led by head coach Teri Moren in her tenth season, and played their home games at the Simon Skjodt Assembly Hall as a member of the Big Ten Conference.

== Previous season ==
The Hoosiers finished the 2022–23 season with a 28–4 record, including 16–2 in Big Ten play to finish in first place in the conference. They received an at-large bid to the 2023 NCAA Division I women's basketball tournament, where they advanced to the second round. Despite being a 1-seed for the first time in program history, they were upset by 9-seed Miami 70–68.

== Offseason ==
On June 12, 2023, Amber Smith was named assistant coach.

=== Departures ===
Indiana departures
Name	Number	Pos.	Height	Year	Hometown	Reason for departure
Kaitlin Peterson	3	G	5'9"	Sophomore	Eufaula, AL	Transferred to UCF
Mona Zaric	24	F	6'2"	Sophomore	Novi Sad, Serbia	Transferred to Harvard
Alyssa Geary	32	F	6'4"	Graduate student	Elmhurst, IL	Graduated
Grace Berger	34	G	6'0"	Graduate student	Louisville, KY	Graduated

=== Incoming transfers ===
Indiana incoming transfers
Name	Pos.	Height	Year	Hometown	Previous school
Sharnecce Currie-Jelks	F	6'2"	Sophomore	Jackson, TN	UT Martin

== Roster ==
2023–24 Indiana Hoosiers women's basketball team
Players
Coaches

Pos.	#	Name	Height	Year	Previous school	Hometown
G	1	Lexus Bargesser	5 ft 9 in (1.75 m)	So	Grass Lake	Grass Lake, MI
G	5	Lenée Beaumont	6 ft 1 in (1.85 m)	Fr	Benet Academy	Lisle, IL
G	12	Yarden Garzon	6 ft 3 in (1.91 m)	So	Ostrovsky	Ra'anana, Israel
G	14	Sara Scalia	5 ft 10 in (1.78 m)	GS	Stillwater; Minnesota	Stillwater, MN
G	20	Julianna LaMendola	6 ft 1 in (1.85 m)	Fr	Coppell	Coppell, TX
G	21	Henna Sandvik	6 ft 0 in (1.83 m)	Fr	Mäkelänrinne	Helsinki, Finland
G	22	Chloe Moore-McNeil	5 ft 11 in (1.8 m)	Sr	Greenfield	Sharon, TN
F	23	Sharnecce Currie-Jelks	6 ft 2 in (1.88 m)	So	South Side; UT Martin	Jackson, TN
C	25	Arielle Wisne	6 ft 5 in (1.96 m)	RS Sr	Thornton	Thornton, CO
G	33	Sydney Parrish	6 ft 2 in (1.88 m)	Sr	Hamilton Southeastern; Oregon	Fishers, IN
F	52	Lilly Meister	6 ft 3 in (1.91 m)	So	John Marshall	Rochester, MN
F	54	Mackenzie Holmes	6 ft 3 in (1.91 m)	GS	Gorham	Gorham, ME

Head coach

- Teri Moren (Purdue)

Assistant coach(es)

- Rhet Wierzba (Austin Peay)
- Linda Sayavongchanh (Drake)
- Amber Smith (Kentucky)

Legend

- (C) Team captain
- (S) Suspended
- (I) Ineligible
- (W) Walk-on
- Injured
- Current redshirt

Roster
Last update: October 17, 2023

== Schedule and results ==
Date time, TV	Rank^{#}	Opponent^{#}	Result	Record	Site (attendance) city, state
Exhibition
November 1, 2023*; 7:00 p.m., B1G+	No. 9	Northwood	W 111–68	—	Simon Skjodt Assembly Hall (7,840); Bloomington, IN
Regular season
November 9, 2023*; 7:00 p.m., B1G+	No. 9	Eastern Illinois	W 96–43	1–0	Simon Skjodt Assembly Hall (8,380); Bloomington, IN
November 12, 2023*; 5:00 p.m., ESPN	No. 9	at No. 15 Stanford	L 64–96	1–1	Maples Pavilion (3,678); Stanford, CA
November 17, 2023*; 7:00 p.m., B1G+	No. 18	Murray State	W 112–79	2–1	Simon Skjodt Assembly Hall (8,432); Bloomington, IN
November 19, 2023*; 7:00 p.m., B1G+	No. 18	Lipscomb	W 77–44	3–1	Simon Skjodt Assembly Hall (8,572); Bloomington, IN
November 23, 2023*; 6:00 p.m., FOX	No. 21	vs. No. 19 Tennessee; Fort Myers Tip-Off	W 71–57	4–1	Suncoast Credit Union Arena (1,314); Fort Myers, FL
November 25, 2023*; 11:00 a.m.	No. 21	vs. Princeton; Fort Myers Tip-Off	W 72–63	5–1	Suncoast Credit Union Arena (511); Fort Myers, FL
November 30, 2023*; 7:00 p.m., ESPN+	No. 17	at Maine	W 67–59	6–1	Cross Insurance Center (5,983); Orono, ME
December 3, 2023*; 2:00 p.m., B1G+	No. 17	Stetson	W 72–34	7–1	Simon Skjodt Assembly Hall (8,789); Bloomington, IN
December 9, 2023; 4:00 p.m., BTN	No. 16	at Rutgers	W 66–56	8–1 (1–0)	Jersey Mike's Arena (3,525); Piscataway, NJ
December 18, 2023*; 7:00 p.m., B1G+	No. 16	Evansville	W 109–56	9–1	Simon Skjodt Assembly Hall (8,227); Bloomington, IN
December 22, 2023*; 2:00 p.m., BTN	No. 16	Bowling Green	W 84–35	10–1	Simon Skjodt Assembly Hall (9,067); Bloomington, IN
December 31, 2023; 12:00 p.m., BTN	No. 16	Illinois	W 77–71	11–1 (2–0)	Simon Skjodt Assembly Hall (11,600); Bloomington, IN
January 4, 2024; 7:00 p.m., BTN	No. 14	Michigan	W 80–59	12–1 (3–0)	Simon Skjodt Assembly Hall (8,723); Bloomington, IN
January 7, 2024; 2:00 p.m., BTN	No. 14	at Nebraska	W 91–69	13–1 (4–0)	Pinnacle Bank Arena (9,059); Lincoln, NE
January 10, 2024; 7:00 p.m., B1G+	No. 14	Penn State	W 75–68	14–1 (5–0)	Simon Skjodt Assembly Hall (8,516); Bloomington, IN
January 13, 2024; 8:00 p.m., FOX	No. 14	at No. 3 Iowa	L 57–84	14–2 (5–1)	Carver–Hawkeye Arena (14,998); Iowa City, IA
January 17, 2024; 8:00 p.m., Peacock	No. 16	Minnesota	W 85–62	15–2 (6–1)	Simon Skjodt Assembly Hall (7,977); Bloomington, IN
January 21, 2024; 2:00 p.m., Peacock	No. 16	at Purdue; Rivalry	W 74–68	16–2 (7–1)	Mackey Arena (11,796); West Lafayette, IN
January 28, 2024; 2:00 p.m., B1G+	No. 14	Northwestern	W 100–59	17–2 (8–1)	Simon Skjodt Assembly Hall (10,776); Bloomington, IN
January 31, 2024; 7:00 p.m., Peacock	No. 10	at Maryland	W 87–73	18–2 (9–1)	Xfinity Center (7,137); College Park, MD
February 4, 2024; 12:00 p.m., FS1	No. 10	at No. 8 Ohio State	L 69–74	18–3 (9–2)	Value City Arena (10,130); Columbus, OH
February 8, 2024; 7:00 p.m., Peacock	No. 14	Michigan State	W 94–91	19–3 (10–2)	Simon Skjodt Assembly Hall (8,580); Bloomington, IN
February 11, 2024; 2:00 p.m., B1G+	No. 14	Purdue; Rivalry	W 95–62	20–3 (11–2)	Simon Skjodt Assembly Hall (13,304); Bloomington, IN
February 14, 2024; 8:00 p.m., Peacock	No. 14	at Wisconsin	W 68–54	21–3 (12–2)	Kohl Center; Madison, WI
February 19, 2024; 2:00 p.m., FOX	No. 14	at Illinois	L 66–86	21–4 (12–3)	State Farm Center (3,878); Champaign, IL
February 22, 2024; 8:00 p.m., Peacock	No. 14	No. 4 Iowa	W 86–69	22–4 (13–3)	Simon Skjodt Assembly Hall (17,222); Bloomington, IN
February 27, 2024; 7:00 p.m., BTN	No. 14	at Northwestern	W 84–64	23–4 (14–3)	Welsh–Ryan Arena (2,864); Evanston, IL
March 3, 2024; 3:00 p.m., Peacock	No. 14	Maryland	W 71–54	24–4 (15–3)	Simon Skjodt Assembly Hall (12,402); Bloomington, IN
Big Ten women's tournament
March 8, 2024; 9:00 p.m., BTN	(3) No. 12	vs. (6) Michigan; Quarterfinals	L 56–69	24–5	Target Center (18,575); Minneapolis, MN
NCAA tournament
March 23, 2024*; 1:30 p.m., ESPN2	(4 A1) No. 14	(13 A1) No. 25 Fairfield; First round	W 89–56	25–5	Simon Skjodt Assembly Hall (12,753); Bloomington, IN
March 25, 2024*; 6:30 p.m., ESPN2	(4 A1) No. 14	(5 A1) No. 18 Oklahoma; Second round	W 75–68	26–5	Simon Skjodt Assembly Hall (12,385); Bloomington, IN
March 29, 2024*; 5:00 p.m., ESPN	(4 A1) No. 14	vs. (1 A1) No. 1 South Carolina; Sweet Sixteen	L 75–79	26–6	MVP Arena (13,597); Albany, NY
*Non-conference game. ^{#}Rankings from AP poll. (#) Tournament seedings in parentheses. A1=Albany 1. All times are in Eastern Time. Source:

== Rankings ==
Ranking movements Legend: ██ Increase in ranking ██ Decrease in ranking
	Week																				
Poll	Pre	1	2	3	4	5	6	7	8	9	10	11	12	13	14	15	16	17	18	19	Final
AP	9	18	21	17	16	15	16	16	14	14	16	14	10	14	14	14	14	12	15	14	12
Coaches	9	17	19	17	15	15	15	15	14	13	16	13	9	13	12	16	12	12	15	14	12
