= Amy Graves =

American physics educator

Amy Lisa Graves (also published as Amy L. Ritzenberg and Amy L. R. Bug) is a retired American physicist and physics educator, the Walter Kemp Professor Emerita in the Natural Sciences and Professor of Physics at Swarthmore College. Her publications include works on gender bias in physics, physics education, and computational simulations of phenomena in condensed matter physics, including jamming.

== Education and career ==
Graves is a 1975 graduate of Laurel School, a private school for girls in Ohio. She double-majored in mathematics and physics at Williams College, graduating summa cum laude and as salutatorian in 1979. She went to the Massachusetts Institute of Technology for graduate study, completing her Ph.D. there in 1984.

Before becoming a faculty member at Swarthmore College in 1988, she was a postdoctoral researcher at Exxon from 1984 to 1986, and then at Columbia University from 1986 to 1988. She retired as Walter Kemp Professor Emerita in 2022.

== Recognition ==
In 2018, Graves was elected as a Fellow of the American Physical Society (APS), after a nomination from the APS Forum on Education, "for extraordinary contributions to physics education, including creatively strengthening the teaching of computational physics and steadily engaging issues of gender and physics through presentations and publications".

== Selected publications ==
- Ritzenberg, Amy L.; Adam, Dan R.; Cohen, Richard Jonathan (January 1984), "Period multupling-evidence for nonlinear behaviour of the canine heart", Nature, 307 (5947): 159–161, Bibcode:1984Natur.307..159R, doi:10.1038/307159a0, PMID 6690994, S2CID 4314169.
- Bug, Amy (Spring 2003), "Has feminism changed physics?", Signs, 28 (3): 881–899, doi:10.1086/345323, JSTOR 10.1086/345323, S2CID 144314817.
- Bug, Amy (2008), Forces and Motion, Physics in Action, Chelsea House, ISBN 978-0-7910-8931-6.
- Bug, Amy (August 2, 2010), "Swimming against the unseen tide", Physics World, 23 (8): 16, Bibcode:2010PhyW...23h..16B, doi:10.1088/2058-7058/23/08/27.
- Wentworth-Nice, Prairie; Ridout, Sean A.; Jenike, Brian; Liloia, Ari; Graves, Amy L. (2020), "Structured randomness: jamming of soft discs and pins", Soft Matter, 16 (22): 5305–5313, arXiv:2004.04792, Bibcode:2020SMat...16.5305W, doi:10.1039/d0sm00577k, PMID 32467960, S2CID 215737193.
