= 2023–24 Purdue Boilermakers women's basketball team =

American college basketball season

2023–24 Purdue Boilermakers women's basketball

WNIT, Great 8
- Conference: Big Ten Conference
- Record: 15–19 (5–13 Big Ten)
- Head coach: Katie Gearlds (3rd season)
- Associate head coach: Kelly Komara
- Assistant coaches: Mark Stephens; Alex Guyton
- Home arena: Mackey Arena

2023–24 Big Ten women's basketball standings
	Conf.				Overall
Team	W		L	PCT	W		L	PCT
No. 16 Ohio State	16	–	2	.889	26	–	6	.813
No. 2 Iowa †	15	–	3	.833	34	–	5	.872
No. 12 Indiana	15	–	3	.833	26	–	6	.813
Michigan State	12	–	6	.667	22	–	9	.710
Nebraska	11	–	7	.611	23	–	12	.657
Michigan	9	–	9	.500	20	–	14	.588
Penn State	9	–	9	.500	22	–	13	.629
Maryland	9	–	9	.500	19	–	14	.576
Illinois	8	–	10	.444	19	–	15	.559
Wisconsin	6	–	12	.333	15	–	17	.469
Minnesota	5	–	13	.278	20	–	16	.556
Purdue	5	–	13	.278	15	–	19	.441
Northwestern	4	–	14	.222	9	–	21	.300
Rutgers	2	–	16	.111	8	–	24	.250
† 2024 Big Ten tournament winner Rankings from AP Poll

The 2023–24 Purdue Boilermakers women's basketball team represented Purdue University during the 2023–24 NCAA Division I women's basketball season. The Boilermakers were led by third-year head coach Katie Gearlds, and played their home games at Mackey Arena where they were a member of the Big Ten Conference.

The Boilermakers finished the season with a 13–18 overall record and a 5–13 record within the Big Ten. In the Big Ten Women's Tournament, the team advanced to the second round where they were defeated 56–64 by the 5th seeded Nebraska Cornhuskers. Freshman forward Mary Ashley Stevenson was named Big Ten Freshman of the Year by the media panel.

== Previous season ==
The Boilermakers finished the season with a 19–11 overall record and a 9–8 record within the Big Ten. In the Big Ten Women's Tournament, the team advanced to the quarterfinals where they were defeated 58–69 by the 7th seeded Iowa Hawkeyes. The 2022–23 season featured the first NCAA Women's Tournament appearance for the Boilermakers since the 2016-17 season. The Boilermakers lost in the First Four to St. John's.

== Roster ==
2023–24 Purdue Boilermakers women's basketball team
Players
Coaches

Pos.	#	Name	Height	Year	Previous school	Hometown
G	1	Amiyah Reynolds	6 ft 0 in (1.83 m)	Fr	South Bend Washington High School	South Bend, Indiana
G	2	Rashunda Jones	5 ft 8 in (1.73 m)	Fr	South Bend Washington High School	South Bend, Indiana
G	3	Jayla Smith	6 ft 0 in (1.83 m)	Jr	Lawrence North High School	Indianapolis, Indiana
G	10	Jeanae Terry	5 ft 11 in (1.8 m)	Sr	Illinois	Detroit, Michigan
G	11	McKenna Layden	6 ft 2 in (1.88 m)	Fr	Northwestern High School	Kokomo, Indiana
F	15	Mila Reynolds	6 ft 3 in (1.91 m)	So	Maryland	South Bend, Indiana
F	20	Mary Ashley Stevenson	6 ft 2 in (1.88 m)	Fr	Dalton School	New York, New York
G	21	Emily Monson	6 ft 1 in (1.85 m)	Fr	Blackman High School	Murfreesboro, Tennessee
G	23	Abbey Ellis	5 ft 6 in (1.68 m)	Sr	Cal Poly	Melbourne, Australia
G	31	Sophie Swanson	5 ft 10 in (1.78 m)	Fr	Barrington Prep	Barrington, Illinois
F	32	Alaina Harper	6 ft 3 in (1.91 m)	So	Grand Canyon	Hartland, Wisconsin
G	33	Madison Layden	6 ft 1 in (1.85 m)	Sr	Northwestern High School	Kokomo, Indiana
F	34	Caitlyn Harper	6 ft 3 in (1.91 m)	Sr	California Baptist	Hartland, Wisconsin

Head coach

- Katie Gearlds (Purdue)

Assistant coach(es)

- Kelly Komara (Purdue)
- Mark Stephens (Morehead State)
- Alex Guyton (Purdue)

Legend

- (C) Team captain
- (S) Suspended
- (I) Ineligible
- (W) Walk-on
- Injured
- Current redshirt

Roster
Last update: January 13, 2024

== Schedule and results ==
Date time, TV	Rank^{#}	Opponent^{#}	Result	Record	Site (attendance) city, state
Exhibition
October 29, 2023*; 2:00 p.m., BTN+		Quincy	W 106–45		Mackey Arena; West Lafayette, IN
Regular season
November 6, 2023*; 8:30 p.m., P12N		at No. 4 UCLA	L 49–92	0–1	Pauley Pavilion (2,157); Los Angeles, CA
November 12, 2023*; 4:00 p.m., BTN+		Southern	W 67–50	1–1	Mackey Arena (5,002); West Lafayette, IN
November 16, 2023*; 7:00 p.m., BTN+		Texas A&M	W 72–58	2–1	Mackey Arena (5,223); West Lafayette, IN
November 20, 2023*; 4:00 p.m., FloSports		vs. Florida; Baha Mar Pink Flamingo Championship	L 49–52	2–2	Baha Mar Convention Center (437); Nassau, Bahamas
November 22, 2023*; 4:00 p.m., FloSports		vs. Georgia; Baha Mar Pink Flamingo Championship	L 57–65	2–3	Baha Mar Convention Center (278); Nassau, Bahamas
November 26, 2023*; 2:00 p.m., BTN+		Southern Indiana	W 95–57	3–3	Mackey Arena (3,683); West Lafayette, IN
December 1, 2023*; 7:00 p.m., ESPN+		at Dayton	W 67–59	4–3	UD Arena (3,250); Dayton, OH
December 3, 2023*; 2:00 p.m., BTN+		Valparaiso	W 83–56	5–3	Mackey Arena (5,305); West Lafayette, IN
December 6, 2023*; 7:00 p.m., BTN+		Southeast Missouri State	W 83–57	6–3	Mackey Arena (3,412); West Lafayette, IN
December 10, 2023; 2:00 p.m., BTN+		at Minnesota	L 58–60	6–4 (0–1)	Williams Arena (3,834); Minneapolis, MN
December 17, 2023*; 12:00 p.m., ACCN		at No. 14 Notre Dame	L 39–76	6–5	Joyce Center (9,149); Notre Dame, IN
December 20, 2023*; 11:00 a.m., BTN+		Indiana State	W 79–63	7–5	Mackey Arena (7,177); West Lafayette, IN
December 30, 2023; 6:00 p.m., BTN		Wisconsin	W 89–50	8–5 (1–1)	Mackey Arena (5,540); West Lafayette, IN
January 2, 2024; 7:00 p.m., BTN+		Rutgers	W 77–76	9–5 (2–1)	Mackey Arena (3,263); West Lafayette, IN
January 10, 2024; 8:00 p.m., Peacock		No. 3 Iowa	L 71–96	9–6 (2–2)	Mackey Arena (14,876); West Lafayette, IN
January 14, 2024; 12:00 p.m., BTN+		at Maryland; Rescheduled from January 6	L 66–88	9–7 (2–3)	Xfinity Center (7,231); College Park, MD
January 18, 2024; 7:00 p.m., BTN		at Penn State	L 67–80	9–8 (2–4)	Bryce Jordan Center (2,266); State College, PA
January 21, 2024; 2:00 p.m., Peacock		No. 16 Indiana	L 68–74	9–9 (2–5)	Mackey Arena (11,796); West Lafayette, IN
January 24, 2024; 6:30 p.m., BTN+		at Michigan State	L 70–97	9–10 (2–6)	Breslin Center (3,096); East Lansing, MI
January 28, 2024; 2:00 p.m., BTN+		No. 12 Ohio State	L 68–71	9–11 (2–7)	Mackey Arena (7,132); West Lafayette, IN
January 31, 2024; 7:00 p.m., BTN+		at Nebraska	L 54–68	9–12 (2–8)	Pinnacle Bank Arena (4,408); Lincoln, NE
February 5, 2024; 8:00 p.m., BTN		Illinois	W 77–72 ^{OT}	10–12 (3–8)	Mackey Arena (3,953); West Lafayette, IN
February 11, 2024; 2:00 p.m., BTN+		at No. 14 Indiana	L 62–95	10–13 (3–9)	Simon Skjodt Assembly Hall (13,304); Bloomington, IN
February 14, 2024; 8:00 p.m., BTN+		at Northwestern	W 74–48	11–13 (4–9)	Welsh–Ryan Arena (1,949); Evanston, IL
February 17, 2024; 4:00 p.m., BTN+		Nebraska	L 65–77	11–14 (4–10)	Mackey Arena (5,205); West Lafayette, IN
February 21, 2024; 7:00 p.m., BTN+		Michigan State	L 59–68	11–15 (4–11)	Mackey Arena (3,856); West Lafayette, IN
February 25, 2024; 4:00 p.m., BTN		at Wisconsin	W 79–55	12–15 (5–11)	Kohl Center (4,700); Madison, WI
February 28, 2024; 7:00 p.m., BTN+		Penn State	L 88–93	12–16 (5–12)	Mackey Arena (4,593); West Lafayette, IN
March 3, 2024; 8:00 p.m., FS1		at Michigan	L 60–64	12–17 (5–13)	Crisler Center (3,202); Ann Arbor, MI
Big Ten Women's Tournament
March 6, 2024; 6:30 p.m., Peacock	(12)	vs. (13) Northwestern; First Round	W 78–72	13–17	Target Center; Minneapolis, MN
March 7, 2024; 3:00 p.m., BTN	(12)	vs. (5) Nebraska; Second Round	L 56–64	13–18	Target Center (18,392); Minneapolis, MN
WNIT
March 25, 2024; 7:00 p.m.		at Butler; Second Round	W 62–51	14–18	Hinkle Fieldhouse (1,968); Indianapolis, IN
March 28, 2024; 7:00 p.m.		Duquesne; Super 16	W 71–50	15–18	Mackey Arena (2,531); West Lafayette, IN
March 31, 2024; 7:00 p.m.		Vermont; Great 8	L 59–67	15–19	Mackey Arena (2,679); West Lafayette, IN
*Non-conference game. ^{#}Rankings from AP Poll. (#) Tournament seedings in parentheses. All times are in Eastern Time.
