= Taylor Thierry =

American basketball player

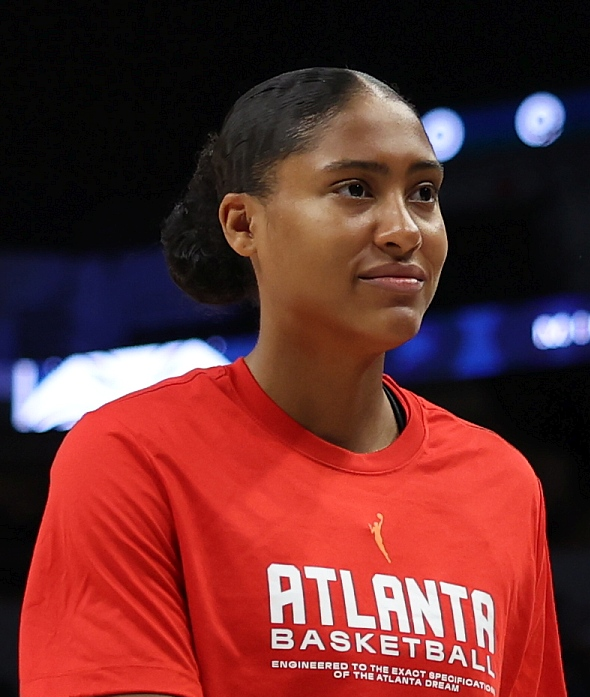
- Thierry with the Atlanta Dream in 2025

No. 5 – Seattle Storm
- Position: Guard/Forward
- League: WNBA

Personal information
- Born: January 8, 2003 (age 23) Cleveland, Ohio, U.S.
- Listed height: 6 ft 1 in (1.85 m)

Career information
- High school: Laurel School (Shaker Heights, Ohio)
- College: Ohio State (2021–2025)
- WNBA draft: 2025: 3rd round, 36th overall pick
- Drafted by: Atlanta Dream
- Playing career: 2025–present

Career history
- 2025: Atlanta Dream
- 2026–present: Seattle Storm

Career highlights
- Big Ten All-Defensive Team (2025)
- Stats at Basketball Reference

Taylor Thierry (born January 8, 2003) is an American professional basketball player for the Seattle Storm of the WNBA. She played college basketball for the Ohio State Buckeyes and was selected in the third round of the 2025 WNBA draft.

== Early life ==
Thierry was born on January 8, 2003, in Cleveland, Ohio. Her father, John Thierry, played in the NFL, while Thierry has a twin sister, Haley, who played basketball with her at Laurel School in Shaker Heights, Ohio. At Laurel, she averaged 16.6 points per game as a junior and was named second-team All-Ohio, and she was named the Division II Player of the Year as a senior. Thierry committed to play college basketball for the Ohio State Buckeyes, while her twin sister joined the Youngstown State Penguins after high school.

== College career ==
As a freshman during the 2021–22 season, Thierry was a backup and averaged 2.9 points per game. She then became a starter in 2022–23, leading the team in rebounding, steals and field goal percentage, while averaging 13.5 points and 6.5 rebounds per game. She helped Ohio State reach the Elite Eight and was named to the Big Ten Conference All-Defensive team. She averaged 11.3 points and 5.3 rebounds as a junior in 2023–24, then totaled 10.2 points and 5.2 rebounds per game as a senior in 2024–25. She repeated as a Big Ten All-Defensive selection and helped Ohio State to the NCAA Tournament as a senior, with her game in the first round of the tournament being her 100th consecutive start for the Buckeyes. She concluded her collegiate career having averaged 9.7 points and 5.2 rebounds and finished in the top five in school history with a field goal percentage of 59.7%.

== Professional career ==
Thierry was selected by the Atlanta Dream in the third round (36th overall) of the 2025 WNBA draft.

On May 7, 2026, Thierry was waived by the Atlanta Dream during final roster cuts ahead of the 2026 WNBA season.

On May 14, 2026, Thierry signed with the Seattle Storm on a Developmental Contract.

In October 2026, Thierry returned to the Ohio State Buckeyes women's basketball program as Director of Player Development.

== Career statistics ==
=== WNBA ===
Legend
| GP | Games played | GS | Games started | MPG | Minutes per game | RPG | Rebounds per game |
| APG | Assists per game | SPG | Steals per game | BPG | Blocks per game | PPG | Points per game |
| TO | Turnovers per game | FG% | Field-goal percentage | 3P% | 3-point field-goal percentage | FT% | Free-throw percentage |
| **Bold** | Career best | ° | League leader |

==== Regular season ====
Stats current through end of 2026 season

WNBA regular season statistics
| Year | Team | GP | GS | MPG | FG% | 3P% | FT% | RPG | APG | SPG | BPG | TO | PPG |
|---|---|---|---|---|---|---|---|---|---|---|---|---|---|
| 2025 | Atlanta | 17 | 0 | 2.1 | .182 | .333 | .250 | 0.4 | 0.1 | 0.2 | 0.0 | 0.1 | 0.4 |
| 2026 | Seattle | 17 | 0 | 9.7 | .355 | .375 | .833 | 1.7 | 0.5 | 0.2 | 0.0 | 0.2 | 1.9 |
| **Career** | 2 years, 2 teams | 34 | 0 | 5.9 | .310 | .368 | .600 | 1.0 | 0.3 | 0.2 | 0.0 | 0.1 | 1.1 |

==== Playoffs ====
WNBA playoff statistics
| Year | Team | GP | GS | MPG | FG% | 3P% | FT% | RPG | APG | SPG | BPG | TO | PPG |
|---|---|---|---|---|---|---|---|---|---|---|---|---|---|
| 2025 | Atlanta | 1 | 0 | 2.0 | — | — | — | — | — | — | — | — | — |
| **Career** | 1 year, 1 team | 1 | 0 | 2.0 | — | — | — | — | — | — | — | — | — |

=== College ===
| Year | Team | GP | GS | MPG | FG% | 3P% | FT% | RPG | APG | SPG | BPG | TO | PPG |
|---|---|---|---|---|---|---|---|---|---|---|---|---|---|
| 2021–22 | Ohio State | 30 | 0 | 15.2 | 54.1 | 20.0 | 64.5 | 3.4 | 0.9 | 1.0 | **0.9** | **0.5** | 2.9 |
| 2022–23 | Ohio State | **36** | **36** | 31.0 | **62.5** | 38.7 | 66.7 | **6.5** | **2.3** | 2.1 | 0.7 | 1.5 | **13.5** |
| 2023–24 | Ohio State | 32 | 32 | 27.0 | 61.0 | 44.8 | **75.7** | 5.3 | 1.5 | 1.7 | 0.5 | 1.0 | 11.3 |
| 2024–25 | Ohio State | 33 | 33 | **31.2** | 56.3 | **46.4** | 69.7 | 5.2 | 1.2 | **2.3** | 0.5 | 1.2 | 10.2 |
| **Career** | | 131 | 101 | 26.4 | 59.7 | 43.0 | 70.1 | 5.2 | 1.5 | 1.8 | 0.7 | 1.1 | 9.7 |
Statistics retrieved from Sports-Reference.
