= Mary Ashley Stevenson =

American basketball player (born 2005)

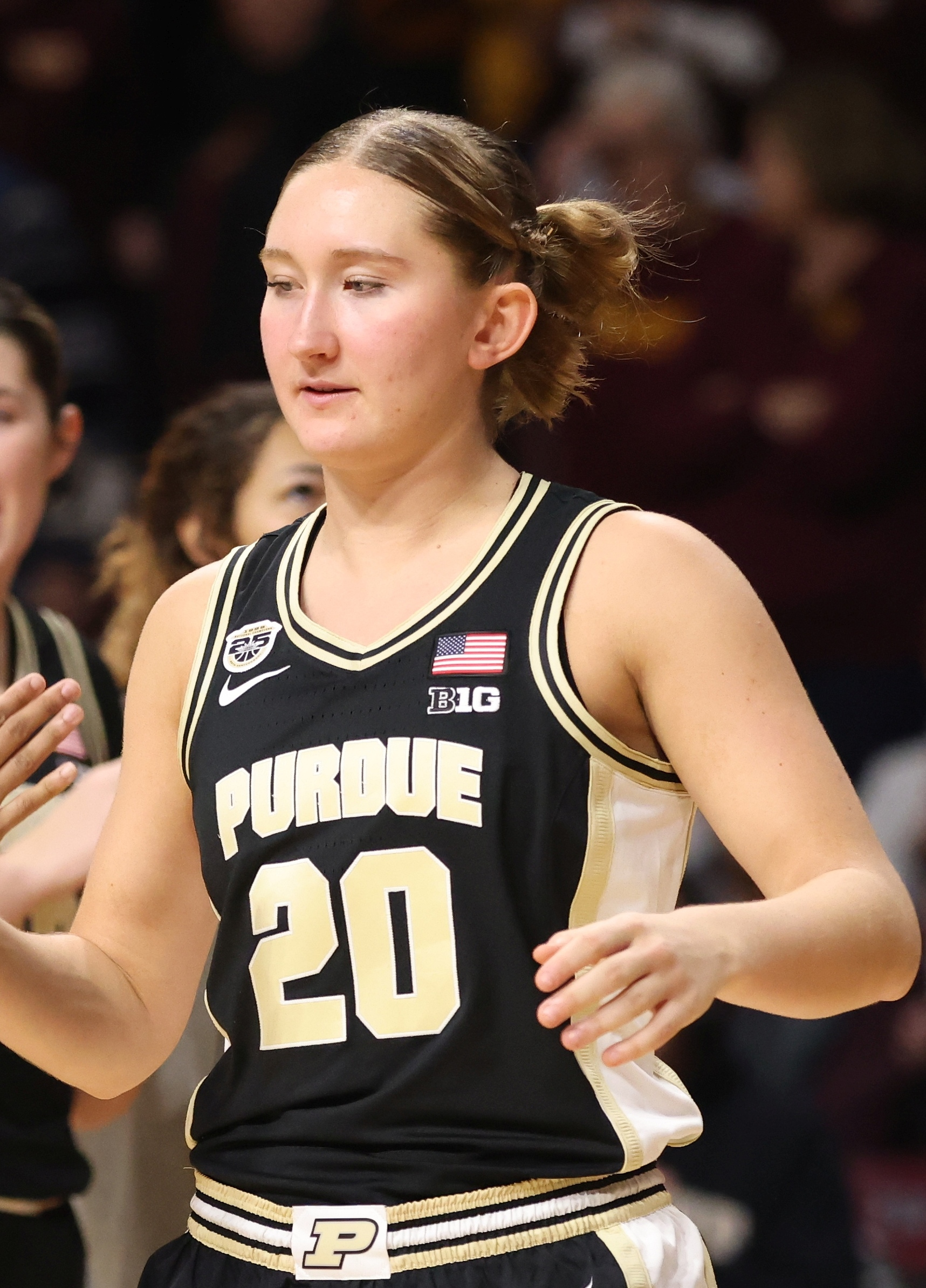
- Stevenson with Purdue in 2023

No. 22 – Stanford Cardinal
- Position: Forward
- League: Atlantic Coast Conference

Personal information
- Born: February 22, 2005 (age 20) Fort Mill, South Carolina, U.S.
- Listed height: 6 ft 2 in (1.88 m)

Career information
- High school: Dalton School (New York City, New York)
- College: Purdue (2023–2024); Stanford (2024–present)

Career highlights
- Big Ten Freshman of the Year – Media (2024); Big Ten All-Freshman Team (2024)

Mary Ashley Stevenson (born February 22, 2005) is an American college basketball player for the Stanford Cardinal of the Atlantic Coast Conference (ACC).

== Early life and high school career ==
Stevenson played her freshman, junior and senior campaigns in high school at the Dalton School in New York City and her sophomore year at Cardinal Newman School in Columbia, South Carolina. At Dalton, she set record for boys or girls with 53 points in a 75–70 win over Staten Island Academy on Feb. 1, 2023. Stevenson lead the Dalton School to NYSAIS State Championships in 2021-22 and 2022–23. While playing for the Cardinal Newman School, Stevenson was named to the SCISA All-Tournament Team. A four-star recruit, Stevenson was the no. 97 player in the nation. In October 2022, she committed to Purdue.

== College career ==
As a freshman, Stevenson averaged 9.7 points and 5.1 rebounds. On February 5, she set a career-high 25 points against Illinois. She was named the Big Ten Freshman of the Year through the media vote, the first Boilermaker in over 20 years to win the award. In May 2024, Stevenson transferred to Stanford.

== Career statistics ==
Legend
GP	Games played	GS	Games started	MPG	Minutes per game	RPG	Rebounds per game
APG	Assists per game	SPG	Steals per game	BPG	Blocks per game	PPG	Points per game
TO	Turnovers per game	FG%	Field-goal percentage	3P%	3-point field-goal percentage	FT%	Free-throw percentage
**Bold**	Career best	°	League leader

=== College ===
Year	Team	GP	GS	MPG	FG%	3P%	FT%	RPG	APG	SPG	BPG	TO	PPG
2023–24	Purdue	**34**	**33**	**27.9**	41.4	9.5	**81.7**	**5.1**	1.0	**0.6**	**0.4**	1.9	**9.7**
2024–25	Stanford	31	8	17.3	**48.2**	**16.7**	65.0	3.4	**1.1**	0.3	0.2	**1.2**	4.4
**Career**		65	41	22.9	43.3	11.1	77.1	4.3	1.1	0.5	0.3	1.6	7.1
Statistics retrieved from Sports-Reference.
