= Martin Wohl =

American transportation economist

Martin Wohl (13 July 1930 – 21 July 2009), was a transportation economist. He was born in Greensboro, North Carolina and grew up in the District of Columbia.

During his youth, Wohl worked as a Senate page and was then appointed to the U.S. Military Academy in West Point, New York from North Carolina's 6th congressional district by Democratic congressman Carl T. Durham. He transferred to the Massachusetts Institute of Technology and served as a first lieutenant in the Army Corps of Engineers after graduation. Wohl later received his M.S. degree in civil engineering from MIT in 1960 with a thesis entitled Applications of symbolic models and simulation in traffic engineering. He subsequently earned a doctor of engineering degree from the University of California at Berkeley in December 1966 with a thesis entitled Development of a rationale for transportation investment.

After completing his master's degree, he became an assistant professor at MIT for two years before moving to Washington D.C., where he worked in the Department of Commerce during the Kennedy administration. After his federal service terminated, Martin became the director of transportation studies at the Urban Institute. In 1972, he accepted a faculty position at Carnegie Mellon University. Wohl retired in 1990, co-authored five technical books, and wrote more than seventy peer-reviewed journal articles on transportation. He is most recognized for "The Urban Transportation Problem" (1965), the book he co-authored with John R. Meyer and John F. Kain.

Martin Wohl got married three times and divorced from all of his wives. He died in 2009 from throat cancer at his home, in Fairfax, Virginia. He was interred at Arlington National Cemetery.
