= Mary Ellen Wohl =

American physician

Mary Ellen Beck Wohl (June 12, 1932 - October 9, 2009) was Chief of the Division of Respiratory Diseases at Children's Hospital Boston (a teaching hospital of Harvard Medical School), and served as Associate Director of the General Clinical Research Center until 2002. Since the 1962, when she first joined the staff at Children's Hospital, Wohl specialized in the respiratory diseases of children. She was also a leader in the field of clinical research on cystic fibrosis. She developed a number of techniques to evaluate the function of the lungs in young children and is the author of many research papers in this field.

== Early life and education ==
Mary Ellen Beck Wohl was born in Cleveland, Ohio on June 12, 1932. Her mother Ellen Manning Beck was a surgical nurse. Her father, Claude Beck, was a surgeon and professor of cardiovascular surgery at Western Reserve University (later Case Western Reserve University). Beck is known for performing the first defibrillation in 1947.

Wohl graduated magna cum laude from Radcliffe College in 1954 with a bachelor of arts degree. She studied history and literature at Radcliffe but also took pre-med courses. Wohl decided against getting a Ph.D. in history and instead went to medical school at Columbia University College of Physicians and Surgeons.

Beck graduated with her M.D. in 1958. She then took an internship at Bellevue Hospital in New York City.

== Career ==
Wohl became a junior assistant resident in pediatrics at Babies' Hospital in New York City in 1959. She became senior assistant resident in 1961.

In 1962, Wohl took a fellowship in medicine at Children's Hospital Boston and research fellowship in physiology at the Harvard School of Public Health. She came to Boston as her husband, Dr. Martin J. Wohl, was completing his senior residency at Massachusetts General Hospital.

In 1980, Wohl was named Chief of the Division of Respiratory Diseases at Boston Children's Hospital. She was head of the hospital's Cystic Fibrosis Center from 1985 to 2002. She trained 60 fellows in pediatric pulmonology in the program she founded and developed. In 2002 she retired from the hospital and was named Division Chief emerita.

Wohl was a member of the American Thoracic Society and the American Academy of Pediatrics and served on committees for both societies. She also served on the editorial board of the American Review of Respiratory Diseases. She held visiting professorships at universities in Colombia, Australia, and Taiwan.

Wohl served on a number of national and regional committees as well as the board of advisors at Harvard Medical School. From 1993 to 1996 she was a member of the faculty council overseeing the Promotions and Reappointments Committee addressing issues concerning women in medicine. Concerned that women today face challenges she never knew of, Wohl stated that she was especially grateful for the opportunities she had early in her career. Beginning with modest ambitions to work alongside her husband and balance a fulfilling career with raising a family, Wohl eventually became a leader in the field of children's respiratory disease and the use of clinical trials in cystic fibrosis research. Born during the Great Depression and attending medical school in the 1950s, Wohl believed she "profited so much from not being visible for many years in the career I had chosen... I was able to progress at my own pace in a field I developed."

== Awards ==
- Edwin L. Kendig Award from the American Academy of Pediatrics and the American Academy of Chest Physicians, 2002 (for outstanding achievements in pediatric pulmonology)
- American Thoracic Society Lifetime Achievement Award, 2001
- Distinguished Alumna Award, 1986, Laurel School
- Her biography was included by the National Library of Medicine in a list of persons that have "Changed the Face of Medicine".

== Significant papers ==
Wohl authored over 60 papers in peer-reviewed scientific journals. The impact of these papers has been considerable: according to the Web of Science several have been cited in dozens, sometimes even hundreds, of other scientific publications.

- Fuchs, HJ; Borowitz, DS; Christiansen, DH; et al. (September 1994). "Effect of aerosolized recombinant human DNase on exacerbations of respiratory symptoms and on pulmonary function in patients with cystic fibrosis. The Pulmozyme Study Group". N. Engl. J. Med. 331: 637–42. doi:10.1056/NEJM199409083311003. PMID 7503821.
