= Kevin McGuff =

American basketball coach

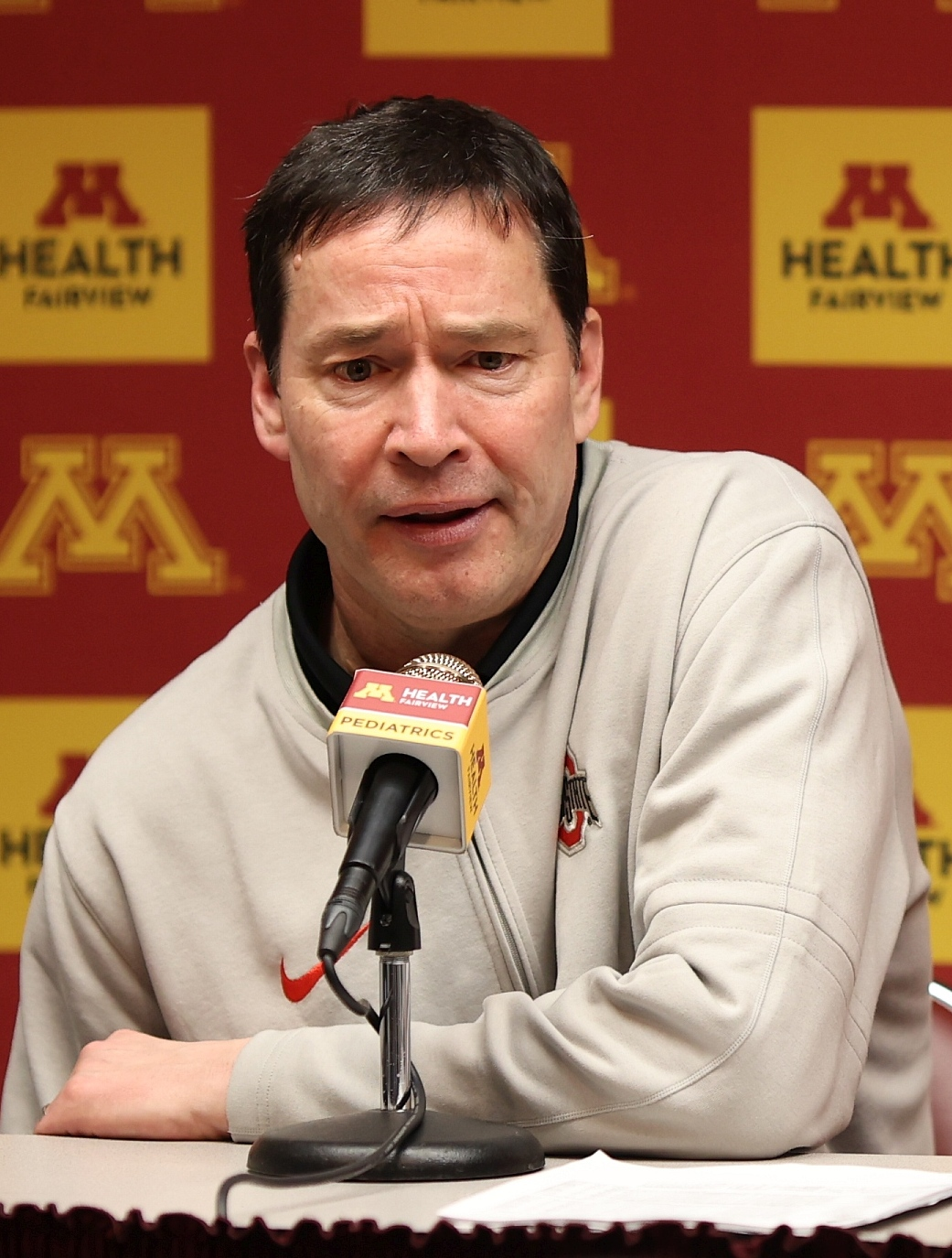
- McGuff in 2024

Current position
- Title: Head coach
- Team: Ohio State
- Conference: Big Ten
- Record: 251–117 (.682)

Biographical details
- Born: December 3, 1969 (age 56); Hamilton, Ohio, U.S.

Playing career
- 1988–1992: Saint Joseph's (Indiana)

Coaching career (HC unless noted)
- 1995–1996: Miami (Ohio) (asst.)
- 1996–2002: Notre Dame (asst.)
- 2002–2011: Xavier
- 2011–2013: Washington
- 2013–present: Ohio State

Head coaching record
- Overall: 506–216 (.701)

Accomplishments and honors

Championships
- 4× Big Ten Regular Season Champion (2017, 2018, 2022, 2024); Big Ten Tournament Champion (2018); 3× Atlantic 10 Regular Season Champion (2009–2011); 4× Atlantic 10 Tournament Champion (2007, 2008, 2010, 2011); Atlantic 10 West Champion (2005); As assistant: NCAA Tournament Champion (2001); Big East Champion (2001)

Awards
- Big Ten Coach of the Year (2024)

Kevin Patrick McGuff (born December 3, 1969) is an American college basketball coach who is the current head women's basketball coach at Ohio State University after spending two seasons as head coach of the University of Washington. Prior to his time in Seattle, McGuff was the head coach at Xavier University until April 2011.

== Coaching career ==
McGuff began his coaching career as an assistant coach at Miami University where the Lady Hawks went 54–30 during his tenure in Oxford, Ohio.

He served as an assistant coach at Notre Dame. During his six years as an Irish assistant coach under Muffet McGraw, Notre Dame went 160–39, including a national title in 2001.

=== Xavier University ===
McGuff spent nine seasons at Xavier, compiling an overall record of 213–73, giving him the most wins of any Xavier women's coach. The Musketeers made the postseason in each of McGuff's seasons as head coach, with the last five being in the NCAA tournament. During this stretch, Xavier's best run was in 2010, when the Musketeers lost in the Elite Eight to Stanford.

=== University of Washington ===
Kevin McGuff's tenure in Washington was short. 2 WNIT appearances is what he brought the Huskies.

=== Ohio State University ===
McGuff was hired by Ohio State on April 16, 2013 to replace Jim Foster. He was formally introduced at a press conference on April 17, 2013. Ohio State owed Washington $1.75 million as part of McGuff's buyout clause from his contract with UW.

== Head coaching record ==
Record table
Season	Team	Overall	Conference	Standing	Postseason
Xavier Musketeers (Atlantic 10 Conference) (2002–2011)
2002–03	Xavier	20–10	11–5	3rd (2nd West)	NCAA 1st Round
2003–04	Xavier	17–13	8–8	T-6th (4th West)	WNIT First Round
2004–05	Xavier	22–10	13–3	T-2nd (1st West)	WNIT Quarterfinals
2005–06	Xavier	21–9	11–5	4th	WNIT Round of 16
2006–07	Xavier	26–8	11–3	3rd	NCAA 1st Round
2007–08	Xavier	24–9	11–3	3rd	NCAA 1st Round
2008–09	Xavier	25–7	13–1	1st	NCAA 1st Round
2009–10	Xavier	30–4	14–0	1st	NCAA Elite Eight
2010–11	Xavier	29–3	14–0	1st	NCAA 2nd Round
Xavier:		214–73 (.746)	106–28 (.791)		
Washington Huskies (Pac-12) (2011–2013)
2011–12	Washington	20–14	8–10	T-7th	WNIT Quarterfinals
2012–13	Washington	21–12	11–7	5th	WNIT 2nd Round
Washington:		41–26 (.612)	19–17(.528)		
Ohio State Buckeyes (Big Ten) (2013–present)
2013–14	Ohio State	17–18	5–11	T-8th	
2014–15	Ohio State	24–11	13–5	3rd	NCAA 2nd Round
2015–16	Ohio State	26–8	15–3	2nd	NCAA Sweet Sixteen
2016–17	Ohio State	28–7*	15–1*	T–1st	NCAA Sweet Sixteen
2017–18	Ohio State	28–7**	13–3**	1st	NCAA 2nd Round
2018–19	Ohio State	14–15***	10–8***	5th	WNIT 1st Round
2019–20	Ohio State	21–12	11–7	T-5th	No postseason held
2020–21	Ohio State	13–7	9–7	7th	Self-imposed ban
2021–22	Ohio State	25–7	14–4	T–1st	NCAA Sweet Sixteen
2022–23	Ohio State	28–8	12–6	4th	NCAA Elite Eight
2023–24	Ohio State	26–6	16–2	1st	NCAA 2nd Round
2024–25	Ohio State	26–7	13–5	T–3rd	NCAA 2nd Round
2025–26	Ohio State	27–8	13–5	T–4th	NCAA 2nd Round
Ohio State:		251–117 (.682)****	129–67 (.658)****		
Total:		506–216 (.701)****			
National champion Postseason invitational champion Conference regular season champion Conference regular season and conference tournament champion Division regular season champion Division regular season and conference tournament champion Conference tournament champion

* Record adjusted to 18–6 (8–1 in conference) after games vacated
** Record adjusted to 0–6 (0–3 in conference) after games vacated
***Record adjusted to 0–14 (0–8 in conference) after games vacated
****Not including vacated games; McGuff's unofficial record is 224–100 at Ohio State and 479–199 overall

== Personal life ==
Kevin attended Saint Joseph's College in Indiana. McGuff and his wife, Letitia, have six children.

On May 6, 2025, McGuff was arrested and charged with operating a vehicle while intoxicated in Dublin, Ohio.
