= David A. Wohl =

American infectious disease physician

- Born: Queens, New York, US
- Spouse: Alison Hilton

Academic background
- Education: MD, University of Medicine and Dentistry of New Jersey

David Alain Wohl is an American infectious disease physician. During the COVID-19 pandemic, he was among those leading UNC's response to the SARS-CoV-2 pandemic. Wohl was appointed the medical director of the COVID Vaccination Clinic at UNC Hospitals Hillsborough Campus and led COVID-19 treatment clinical trials at UNC School of Medicine.

== Early life and education ==
Wohl was born and raised in Queens, New York. He completed his medical degree at the University of Medicine and Dentistry of New Jersey in 1991 which he followed with his residency at Duke University and fellowship at the UNC School of Medicine in 1997.

== Career ==
Upon completing his fellowship, Wohl remained at the UNC School of Medicine as a faculty member in their division of infectious diseases. As an assistant professor of medicine, he published a study finding that patients with AIDS may be at significantly greater risk of death when cytomegalovirus (CMV) reaches their blood. The study then raised an issue about whether people infected with HIV should receive preemptive treatment with drugs against CMV.

As a professor of medicine in the division of infectious diseases, Wohl and colleague William A. Fischer II collaborated with healthcare workers in Liberia to combat Ebola. They later wrote about their experiences in a piece published in The New England Journal of Medicine, arguing that "patients with Ebola virus disease in countries with limited resources should be treated according to the same standard of care that is used in countries where resources are more readily available." In 2017, Wohl and Fischer found that survivors of Ebola still carried the infection in their semen even two years later.

During the COVID-19 pandemic in North America, Wohl was one of North Carolina's leaders against the disease. He was appointed the medical director of the COVID Vaccination Clinic at UNC Hospitals Hillsborough Campus and led COVID-19 treatment clinical trials at UNC. Wohl also collaborated with Natalie Bowman to track COVID-19 patients in the hospital and local community, and worked with the AIDS Clinical Trials Group to test therapeutics (hydroxychloroquine plus azithromycin) for early traces of COVID-19. In October 2020, Wohl launched one of 25 clinical trials set up nationally to test COVID-19 treatments and vaccines. The following month, his work was recognized with the inaugural Charles Van Der Horst Humanitarian Award for his advocacy, research, treatment and care of infectious diseases. He was also one of the first recipients of the COVID vaccine once it was made available in North Carolina.

== Personal life ==
Wohl and his wife Alison Hilton have two children together.
