= Carla Morrow (basketball) =

American basketball coach

Current position
- Title: Associate Head Coach
- Team: Fordham
- Conference: Atlantic Ten

Biographical details
- Education: University of Tulsa; Missouri State University

Playing career
- 1998–2002: Tulsa

Coaching career (HC unless noted)
- 2002–2003: Tulsa Central High School
- 2007–2011: Xavier (assistant)
- 2017–2019: Chicago Sky (assistant)
- 2019–2021: Ohio State (assistant)
- 2021–2026: Ohio State (associate HC)
- 2026-present: Fordham University (associate HC)

Carla D. Morrow is the associate head coach for Fordham Rams women's basketball team. She is a former assistant coach of the Chicago Sky of the Women's National Basketball Association and at Xavier University. She is also the former Associate Head Coach for Ohio State Buckeyes women's basketball. She attended the University of Tulsa, where she played college basketball.

== Career ==
- Missouri State University – Director of Basketball Operations
- University of Colorado – Director of Basketball Operations
- Xavier University – Assistant Coach
- Chicago Sky – Assistant Coach
- Ohio State University - Associate Head Coach
