= Karla Vreš =

Croatian basketball player

No. 15 – Visby BBK
- Position: Small forward / center
- League: Swedish First League

Personal information
- Born: January 8, 1999 (age 27) Zagreb, Croatia
- Listed height: 1.91 m (6 ft 3 in)

Career information
- Playing career: 2014–present

Career history
- 2014–2015: Trešnjevka 2009
- 2015-present: Visby BBK

Karla Vreš (born January 8, 1999) is a Croatian professional basketball player.
