= Michigan–Ohio State women's basketball rivalry =

American college basketball rivalry

- Michigan Wolverines Ohio State Buckeyes
- Sport: Basketball
- First meeting: January 3, 1978; Ohio State 94, Michigan 47
- Latest meeting: February 25, 2026; Michigan 88, Ohio State 86^{OT}
- Next meeting: January 7, 2027; Ann Arbor, Michigan

Statistics
- Total meetings: 80
- All-time series: Ohio State leads, 62–18
- Largest victory: Ohio State, 94–47 (1978)
- Longest win streak: Ohio State, 16 (1982–1990)
- Current win streak: Michigan, 1 (2026–present)

Locations of Michigan and Ohio State

The Michigan–Ohio State women's basketball rivalry is a college basketball rivalry between the Michigan Wolverines and Ohio State Buckeyes women's basketball programs that is part of the larger rivalry between the University of Michigan and Ohio State University. The rivalry between the Wolverines and Buckeyes notably includes football and men's basketball.

== Series history ==
As of the end of the 2023–24 season, Ohio State leads the series 61–17, including winning 30 of the first 32 meetings between the two teams. With both teams being in the Big Ten Conference, the teams have met at least once a year since 1978. In January 2011, Michigan completed its first season sweep of Ohio State.

From 2010 to 2021, only two of the last 20 games between Michigan and Ohio State have had a margin larger than 11 points. While the last twelve games between the rivals have each been decided by single digits. Michigan has seven wins over Ohio State since Kim Barnes Arico took over as head coach in 2012–13, accounting for 44 percent of Michigan's 16 all-time wins against the Buckeyes.

On January 7, 2012, Michigan upset No. 8 Ohio State 73–62. This marked the Wolverines first win over Ohio State when the Buckeyes were ranked in the Top-10. This also marked the Wolverines third consecutive win over the Buckeyes, who were ranked each time, their longest win streak during the rivalry.

On January 7, 2018, for the first time in the series' history dating back to 1978, the teams met while both were ranked in the Top-25. The Buckeyes were ranked No. 10 in both the AP Poll and the Coaches Poll, while the Wolverines were ranked No. 22 in the AP Poll and No. 20 in the Coaches Poll. Ohio State won the game 78–71 in overtime. On January 16, 2018, the teams again met while both were ranked in the Top-25. The Buckeyes (16–2, 5–0 Big Ten) were ranked No. 8 in both the AP Poll and Coaches Poll, while the Wolverines (15–4, 4–2 Big Ten) were ranked No. 19 in the AP Poll and No. 18 in the Coaches Poll. Michigan upset Ohio State 84–75.

On February 21, 2021, the teams met while both were ranked in the Top-25. The Wolverines (13–2, 8–2 Big Ten) were ranked No. 11 in both the AP Poll and Coaches Poll, while the Buckeyes (13–4, 9–4 Big Ten) were ranked No. 15 in the AP Poll and No. 14 in the Coaches Poll. Michigan won the game 75–66.

On December 31, 2021, the teams met while both were ranked in the Top-25. The Wolverines (11–1, 2–0 Big Ten) were ranked No. 9 in the AP Poll and No. 7 in the Coaches Poll, while the Buckeyes (9–2, 1–1 Big Ten) were ranked No. 25 in both the AP Poll and Coaches Poll. Michigan won the game 90–71. This was Michigan's largest margin of victory over Ohio State in the history of the rivalry.

On January 27, 2022, the teams met while both were ranked in the Top-25. The Wolverines (17–2, 8–1 Big Ten) were ranked No. 7 in both the AP Poll and Coaches Poll, while the Buckeyes (15–3, 7–2 Big Ten) were ranked No. 22 in the AP Poll, and No. 19 Coaches Poll. Michigan won the game 77–58. This matched Michigan's largest margin of victory over Ohio State in the history of the rivalry. The win marked Michigan's first season sweep over Ohio State since the 2010–11 season.

On March 3, 2023, Ohio State defeated Michigan 81–79 in the 2023 Big Ten women's basketball tournament marking the first time in series history that both teams met three times in a single season, and the first time either team defeated the other three teams in a single season, with the Buckeyes completing three victories against the Wolverines in the 2022–23 season.

== Rival accomplishments ==
The following summarizes the accomplishments of the two programs.

Team	Michigan	Ohio State
National titles	0	0
Final Four appearances	0	1
NCAA Tournament appearances	8	24
Big Ten tournament titles	0	5
Big Ten regular season titles	0	15
Big Ten Players of the Year	1	15
All-time program record	582–688	1,061–461
All-time winning percentage	.458	.697

== Game results ==
Michigan victories	Ohio State victories	Tie games	Vacated wins

No.	Date	Location	Winner	Score
1	January 3, 1978	Columbus, OH	Ohio State	94–47
2	January 15, 1979	Ann Arbor, MI	Ohio State	88–83
3	January 8, 1980	Columbus, OH	Ohio State	75–52
4	February 24, 1981	Ann Arbor, MI	Michigan	79–71
5	January 9, 1982	Columbus, OH	Ohio State	80–64
6	January 21, 1983	Ann Arbor, MI	Ohio State	82–62
7	February 27, 1983	Columbus, OH	Ohio State	74–60
8	January 20, 1984	Columbus, OH	Ohio State	68–45
9	February 26, 1984	Ann Arbor, MI	Ohio State	86–69
10	January 6, 1985	Columbus, OH	Ohio State	79–51
11	March 7, 1985	Ann Arbor, MI	Ohio State	73–57
12	January 5, 1986	Ann Arbor, MI	Ohio State	77–53
13	March 6, 1986	Columbus, OH	Ohio State	73–48
14	January 9, 1987	Columbus, OH	Ohio State	72–48
15	February 8, 1987	Ann Arbor, MI	Ohio State	72–61
16	January 15, 1988	Ann Arbor, MI	Ohio State	77–66
17	February 14, 1988	Columbus, OH	Ohio State	87–73
18	January 13, 1989	Ann Arbor, MI	Ohio State	85–70
19	February 12, 1989	Columbus, OH	Ohio State	89–51
20	January 12, 1990	Columbus, OH	Ohio State	84–67
21	February 11, 1990	Ann Arbor, MI	Michigan	58–55
22	January 25, 1991	Ann Arbor, MI	Ohio State	81–70^{OT}
23	February 24, 1991	Columbus, OH	Ohio State	89–81
24	January 31, 1992	Columbus, OH	Ohio State	73–56
25	March 1, 1992	Ann Arbor, MI	Ohio State	73–59
26	January 22, 1993	Columbus, OH	Ohio State	90–73
27	February 21, 1993	Ann Arbor, MI	Ohio State	79–59
28	January 21, 1994	Ann Arbor, MI	Ohio State	81–61
29	February 20, 1994	Columbus, OH	Ohio State	80–73
30	January 22, 1995	Ann Arbor, MI	Ohio State	94–79
31	January 21, 1996	Columbus, OH	Ohio State	83–75
32	December 28, 1996	Columbus, OH	Ohio State	78–55
33	February 23, 1997	Ann Arbor, MI	Michigan	74–65
34	December 28, 1997	Ann Arbor, MI	Ohio State	70–66
35	February 22, 1998	Columbus, OH	Ohio State	88–80
36	January 29, 1999	Ann Arbor, MI	Michigan	85–71^{OT}
37	February 6, 2000	Columbus, OH	Michigan	65–61
38	January 14, 2001	Ann Arbor, MI	Ohio State	76–68
39	January 21, 2001	Columbus, OH	Michigan	76–63
40	January 10, 2002	Ann Arbor, MI	Ohio State	77–66
41	February 10, 2002	Columbus, OH	Ohio State	88–75

No.	Date	Location	Winner	Score
42	February 27, 2003	Columbus, OH	Ohio State	70–55
43	January 29, 2004	Ann Arbor, MI	Ohio State	51–49
44	January 11, 2005	Ann Arbor, MI	Ohio State	84–56
45	February 10, 2005	Columbus, OH	Ohio State	72–39
46	January 15, 2006	Columbus, OH	Ohio State	62–34
47	February 10, 2006	Ann Arbor, MI	Ohio State	74–55
48	February 25, 2007	Ann Arbor, MI	Ohio State	72–58
49	January 3, 2007	Columbus, OH	No. 21 Ohio State	66–42
50	December 21, 2008	Columbus, OH	Ohio State	70–50
51	January 29, 2009	Ann Arbor, MI	No. 15 Ohio State	52–44
52	January 3, 2010	Columbus, OH	Ohio State	59–56
53	January 21, 2010	Ann Arbor, MI	No. 5 Ohio State	58–56
54	December 30, 2010	Ann Arbor, MI	Michigan	64–51
55	January 27, 2011	Columbus, OH	Michigan	69–66
56	January 7, 2012	Ann Arbor, MI	Michigan	73–62
57	March 2, 2012	Indianapolis, IN	No. 14 Ohio State	57–48
58	March 3, 2013	Columbus, OH	Ohio State	66–55
59	January 5, 2014	Columbus, OH	Michigan	64–49
60	January 23, 2014	Ann Arbor, MI	Ohio State	60–51
61	January 11, 2015	Ann Arbor, MI	Michigan	100–94^{OT}
62	February 10, 2015	Columbus, OH	Ohio State	77–73
63	January 21, 2016	Ann Arbor, MI	No. 7 Ohio State	97–93
64	January 7, 2017	Columbus, OH	No. 11 Ohio State	96–87
65	January 7, 2018	Ann Arbor, MI	No. 10 Ohio State	78–71^{OT}
66	January 16, 2018	Columbus, OH	Michigan	84–75
67	January 20, 2019	Ann Arbor, MI	Michigan	62–58
68	January 9, 2020	Columbus, OH	Ohio State	78–69
69	March 7, 2020	Indianapolis, IN	Ohio State	66–60
70	January 21, 2021	Columbus, OH	No. 17 Ohio State	81–77
71	February 21, 2021	Ann Arbor, MI	No. 11 Michigan	75–66
72	December 31, 2021	Ann Arbor, MI	No. 9 Michigan	90–71
73	January 27, 2022	Columbus, OH	No. 7 Michigan	77–58
74	December 31, 2022	Columbus, OH	No. 3 Ohio State	66–57
75	February 20, 2023	Ann Arbor, MI	No. 16 Ohio State	74–61
76	March 3, 2023	Minneapolis, MN	No. 14 Ohio State	81–79
77	December 30, 2023	Ann Arbor, MI	Michigan	69–60
78	February 28, 2024	Columbus, OH	No. 2 Ohio State	67–51
79	January 8, 2025	Ann Arbor, MI	No. 9 Ohio State	84–77
80	February 25, 2026	Columbus, OH	No. 8 Michigan	88–86^{OT}
Series: Ohio State leads 62–18
