= Laurel School =

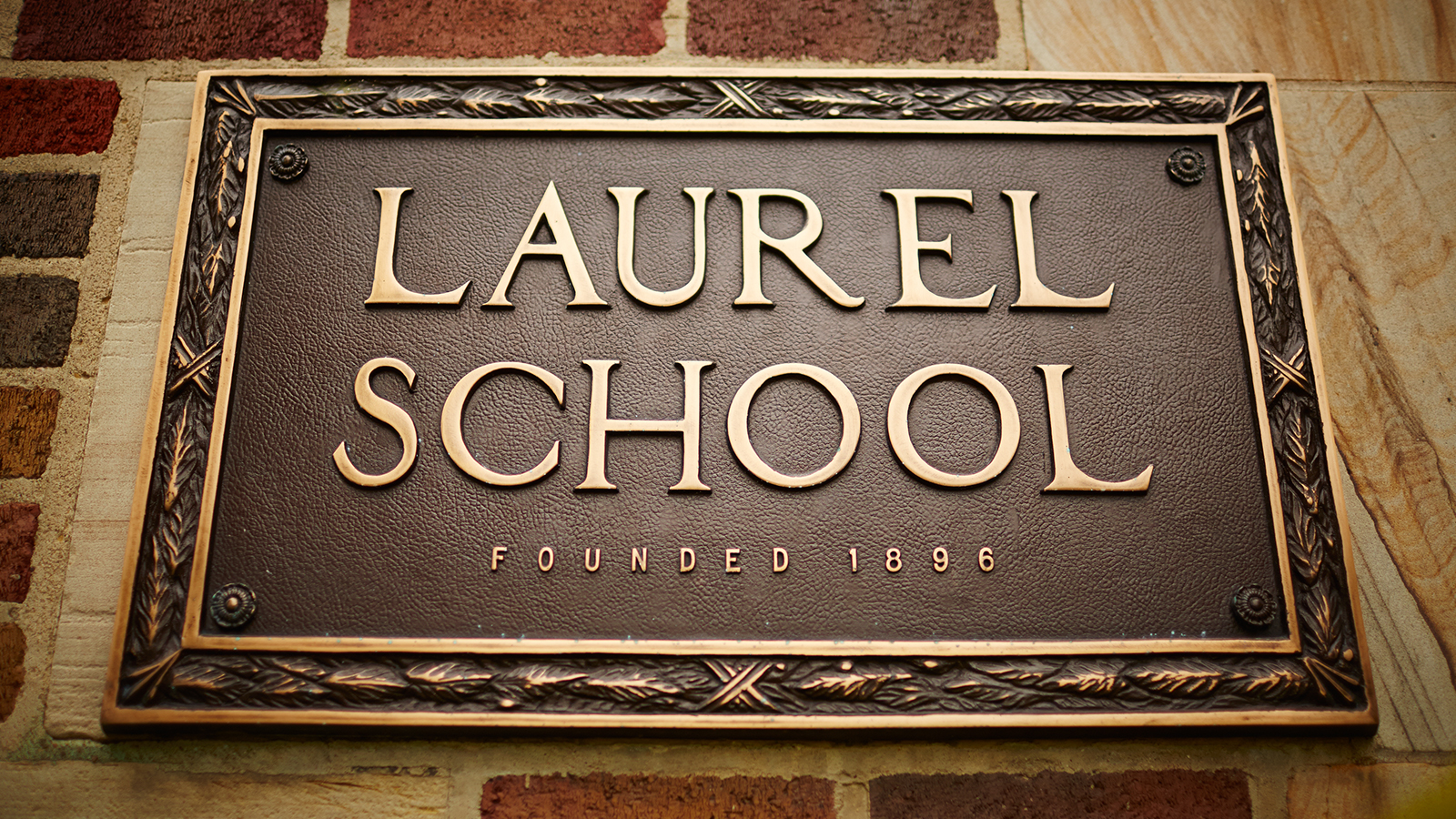
- Plaque located at the school

Location
- 1 Lyman Circle; Shaker Heights, Ohio 44122; United States; 41°28′56″N 81°30′46″W

Information
- Type: Private school
- Motto: Latin: Abeunt Studia in Mores (Studies Pass on into Character)
- Established: 1896; 130 years ago
- Founder: Jennie Prentiss
- NCES School ID: A1790412
- Head of school: Christina Breen
- Grades: PK–12
- Gender: Girls
- Enrollment: 578 (2023–2024)
- Campus type: Suburban and rural
- Colors: Green and white
- Athletics conference: Ohio High School Athletic Association
- Nickname: Gators
- Publication: Highlights Magazine, School of Thought blog
- Yearbook: Laurel Leaves
- Website: www.laurelschool.org

Laurel School is a private school for girls in Shaker Heights, Ohio, United States. It was established in 1896 by Jennie Prentiss and operates on two campuses; the Lyman Campus in Shaker Heights and the Butler Campus in Novelty. Athletic teams are known as the Gators and they compete as a member of the Ohio High School Athletic Association.

== History ==
Laurel School was established in 1896 by Jennie Prentiss. The school was originally established in Cleveland with the mission of providing young women with a rigorous academic education that emphasized character, leadership, and intellectual development. From its earliest years, Laurel was known for preparing students for higher education and fostering independence in young women.

In the early 20th century, the school experienced significant growth under the leadership of Sarah E. Lyman, who expanded the curriculum and facilities. In 1928, Laurel moved from Cleveland to a newly constructed Tudor-style campus at Lyman Circle in Shaker Heights, a planned suburban community designed by developers Oris Paxton Van Sweringen and Mantis James Van Sweringen. The relocation was part of a broader effort to bring prestigious schools to the growing suburb.

Throughout the 20th century, Laurel continued to evolve academically and physically. The school expanded its academic offerings, added modern science and athletic facilities, and established a chapter of the Cum Laude Society in 1932 to recognize academic excellence. In the early 1970s, Laurel closed its residential dormitory as enrollment shifted toward day students, and the space was renovated for new science classrooms and middle school facilities.

In the late 20th and early 21st centuries, Laurel expanded further to support experiential learning and athletics. In 1998, the school purchased more than 140 acres in Russell Township for what became the Butler Campus, allowing students to participate in outdoor education programs and athletic training facilities.

== Athletics ==
Laurel School currently offers:

- Basketball
- Cross country
- Golf
- Gymnastics
- Field hockey
- Lacrosse
- Soccer
- Softball
- Swimming and diving
- Tennis
- Track and field
- Volleyball

=== State championships ===
- Girls' basketball – 2026

=== Facilities ===
- Butler Fitness Center - The Alice Lehmann Butler ’49 Center for Fitness and Wellness is open to students in grades 7th through 12th, alumni, faculty, staff and parents. It offers various programs including strength training, circuit workout, cardiovascular training, etc.

== Notable alumni ==
- Natalie Babbitt, author and illustrator
- Tamara Broderick, mathematician and computer scientist
- Kay Chorao, artist, illustrator, and writer
- Christine Chubbuck, television journalist
- Amanda Cinalli, professional soccer player
- Constance Coleman Richardson, painter
- Donna Ferrato, photojournalist and activist
- Amy Graves, physicist
- Marcia Gygli King, artist
- Jean Harris, convicted murderer and former head of the Madeira School
- Josephine Herrick, photographer, humanitarian, entrepreneur, and teacher
- Marne Levine, businesswoman
- Katharine Lee Reid, art historian
- Taylor Thierry, professional basketball player in the WNBA (Women's National Basketball Association)
- Sonja Warfield, American writer and producer
- Mary Ellen Wohl, physician and clinical researcher
- Dare Wright, children's author, model, and photographer
