= 2022–23 Big 12 Conference women's basketball season =

- League: NCAA Division I
- Sport: Basketball
- Teams: 10

WNBA Draft
- Top draft pick: Stephanie Soares, Iowa State
- Picked by: Dallas Wings, 4th overall

2022–23 NCAA Division I women's basketball season
- Regular season champions: Oklahoma & Texas
- Season MVP: Ashley Joens

Big 12 Conference tournament
- Champions: Iowa State
- Runners-up: Texas
- Tournament MVP: Ashley Joens

Big 12 Conference women's basketball seasons
- ← 2021–22 2023–24 →

2022–23 Big 12 Conference women's basketball standings
	Conf.				Overall
Team	W		L	PCT	W		L	PCT
No. 15 Texas	14	–	4	.778	26	–	10	.722
No. 16 Oklahoma	14	–	4	.778	26	–	7	.788
No. 17 Iowa State†	11	–	7	.611	22	–	10	.688
Oklahoma State	10	–	8	.556	21	–	12	.636
West Virginia	10	–	8	.556	19	–	12	.613
Baylor	10	–	8	.556	20	–	13	.606
Kansas	9	–	9	.500	22	–	11	.667
Texas Tech	6	–	12	.333	20	–	15	.571
Kansas State	5	–	13	.278	19	–	16	.543
TCU	1	–	17	.056	8	–	23	.258
† 2023 Big 12 Tournament winner As of March 24, 2023; Rankings from AP poll

The 2022–23 Big 12 Conference women's basketball season began non-conference play on November 7, 2022. The conference schedule began on December 31, 2022. This will be the twenty-seventh season under the Big 12 Conference name.

The Big 12 Conference tournament is scheduled for March 9–10, 2023 at the Municipal Auditorium in Kansas City, Missouri.

== Pre-season ==
=== Preseason watchlists ===
Below is a table of notable preseason watch lists.

**Wooden**	**Naismith**	**Lieberman**	**Drysdale**	**Miller**	**McClain**	**Leslie**	**Wade**
Aijha Blackwell – Baylor; Lexi Donarski – Iowa State; Shaylee Gonzales – Texas; Rori Harmon – Texas; Ashley Joens – Iowa State; Taylor Robertson – Oklahoma; Madi Williams – Oklahoma	Aijha Blackwell – Baylor; Rori Harmon – Texas; Ashley Joens – Iowa State; Aaliyah Moore – Texas; Taylor Robertson – Oklahoma; Emily Ryan – Iowa State; Madi Williams – Oklahoma	Rori Harmon – Texas; Emily Ryan – Iowa State	Ja'Mee Asberry – Baylor; Sonya Morris – Texas; Taylor Robertson – Oklahoma	Aijha Blackwell – Baylor; Lior Garzon – Oklahoma State; Shay Holle – Texas; Ashley Joens – Iowa State; Madi Williams – Oklahoma	Aaliyah Moore – Texas	Taylor Jones – Texas	Rori Harmon – Texas; Ashley Joens – Iowa State

=== Preseason polls ===
AP
Ranking	Team
3	Texas
8	Iowa State
15	Oklahoma
18	Baylor

USA Today Coaches
Ranking	Team
3	Texas
9	Iowa State
16	Oklahoma
17	Baylor

==== Big 12 Conference Coaches' Poll ====
Women's Basketball Preseason Poll (Coaches)
Place	Team	Points	FPV
1.	Iowa State	75	4
2.	Texas	74	4
3.	Oklahoma	65	1
4.	Baylor	62	1
5.	Kansas	49	—
6.	Kansas State	37	―
7.	Texas Tech	29	―
8.	West Virginia	26	―
9.	Oklahoma State	23	―
10.	TCU	10	―

=== Big 12 Conference Preseason All-Conference ===
==== Preseason All-Big 12 Team ====
Name	School	Yr.	Pos.	Ht.	Hometown (Last School)
Sarah Andrews	Baylor	Jr.	G	5'6	Irving, TX (MacArthur HS)
Aijha Blackwell	Baylor	Sr.	G	5'11	Berkeley, MO (Missouri)
Lexi Donarski	Iowa State	Jr.	G	6'0	La Crosse, WI (Aquinas HS)
**Rori Harmon**	Texas	So.	G	5'6	Houston, TX (Cypress Creek HS)
**Ashley Joens**	Iowa State	Sr.	G/F	6'1	Iowa City, IA (City HS)
Holly Kersgieter	Kansas	Jr.	G	5'11	Sand Springs, OK (Charles Page HS)
Aaliyah Moore	Texas	So.	F	6'1	Moore, OK (Moore HS)
**Taylor Robertson**	Oklahoma	R-Sr.	G	6'0	McPherson, KS (McPherson HS)
Emily Ryan	Iowa State	Jr.	G	5'11	Claflin, KS (Central Plains HS)
Serena Sundell	Kansas State	So.	G	6'1	Maryville, MO (Maryville HS)
**Madi Williams**	Oklahoma	R-Sr.	F	6'0	Fort Worth, TX (Trinity Valley School)

- Unanimous selections are shown in **Bold**
- A tie for the 10th spot resulted in 11 selections

Honorable Mentions

Ja’Mee Asberry (Baylor), Dre’Una Edwards (Baylor), Zakiyah Franklin (Kansas), Taiyanna Jackson (Kansas), Ana Llanusa (Oklahoma), Shaylee Gonzales (Texas), Taylor Jones (Texas), Sonya Morris (Texas), JJ Quinerly (West Virginia), Madisen Smith (West Virginia)

Preseason Player of the Year

- Ashley Joens - Iowa State

Preseason Newcomer of the Year

- Aijha Blackwell - Baylor

Preseason Freshman of the Year

- Darianna Littlepage-Buggs - Baylor

=== Midseason watchlists ===
Below is a table of notable midseason watch lists.

**Wooden**	**Naismith**	**Lieberman**	**Drysdale**	**Miller**	**McClain**	**Leslie**	**Wade**
Ashley Joens – Iowa State; Madi Williams – Oklahoma	Rori Harmon – Texas; Ashley Joens – Iowa State; Madi Williams – Oklahoma	Rori Harmon – Texas	Gabby Gregory – Kansas State	Ashley Joens – Iowa State; Madi Williams – Oklahoma	–	Taiyanna Jackson – Kansas	Rori Harmon – Texas; Ashley Joens – Iowa State

=== Final watchlists ===
Below is a table of notable year end watch lists.

**Wooden**	**Naismith**	**Liberman**	**Drysdale**	**Miller**	**McClain**	**Leslie**	**Wade**
Ashley Joens – Iowa State		–	–	Ashley Joens – Iowa State; Madi Williams – Oklahoma	–	–	

== Regular season ==
=== Record against ranked non-conference opponents ===
This is a list of games against ranked opponents only (rankings from the AP Poll):

Date	Visitor	Home	Site	Significance	Score	Conference record
Nov 12	TCU	No. 12 North Carolina	Carmichael Arena ● Chapel Hill, NC	―	L 48–75	0–1
Nov 14	No. 3 Texas	No. 5 UConn	Harry A. Gampel Pavilion ● Storrs, CT	―	L 76–83	0–2
Nov 16	No. 16 Oklahoma	No. 25 Utah	Jon M. Huntsman Center ● Salt Lake City, UT	―	L 78–124	0–3
Nov 17	No. 4 Iowa	Kansas State	Bramlage Coliseum ● Manhattan, KS	―	W 84–83	1–3
Nov 20	No. 19 Maryland	No. 17 Baylor	Ferrell Center ● Waco, TX	―	L 68–73	1–4
Nov 20	No. 6 Louisville	No. 3 Texas †	Imperial Arena ● Paradise Island, Bahamas	Battle 4 Atlantis	L 63–71	1–5
Nov 25	No. 13 NC State	West Virginia †	Hard Rock Hotel Riviera Maya ● Cancún, Mexico	Cancún Challenge	L 40–78	1–6
Nov 26	No. 23 Villanova	No. 21 Baylor †	Hertz Arena ● Estero, FL	Gulf Coast Showcase	W 75–70	2–6
Nov 27	No. 8 North Carolina	No. 5 Iowa State †	Moda Center ● Portland, OR	Phil Knight Invitational	L 64–73	2–7
Nov 27	No. 22 Michigan	No. 21 Baylor †	Hertz Arena ● Estero, FL	Gulf Coast Showcase	L 75–84	2–8
Dec 7	No. 10 Iowa State	No. 16 Iowa	Carver–Hawkeye Arena ● Iowa City, IA	Iowa Corn Cy-Hawk Series	L 57–70	2–9
Dec 8	Kansas	No. 12 Arizona	McKale Center ● Tucson, AZ	―	W 77–50	3–9
Dec 18	No. 14 Iowa State	No. 25 Villanova †	Mohegan Sun Arena ● Uncasville, CT	Basketball Hall of Fame Women's Showcase	W 74–62	4–9
Dec 18	No. 20 Arizona	No. 18 Baylor †	American Airlines Center ● Dallas, TX	Pac-12 Coast-to-Coast Challenge	L 54–75	4–10
Mar 17	West Virginia	No. 25 Arizona †	Xfinity Center ● College Park, MD	NCAA tournament (first round)	L 62–75	4–11
Mar 20	Baylor	No. 6 UConn	Harry A. Gampel Pavilion ● Storrs, CT	NCAA tournament (second round)	L 58–77	4–12
Mar 20	No. 16 Oklahoma	No. 14 UCLA	Pauley Pavilion ● Los Angeles, CA	NCAA tournament (second round)	L 73–82	4–13

Team rankings are reflective of AP poll when the game was played, not current or final ranking

† denotes game was played on neutral site

=== Rankings ===
Legend
Increase in ranking
Decrease in ranking
Not ranked previous week
First Place votes shown in ()

		Pre	Wk 2	Wk 3	Wk 4	Wk 5	Wk 6	Wk 7	Wk 8	Wk 9	Wk 10	Wk 11	Wk 12	Wk 13	Wk 14	Wk 15	Wk 16	Wk 17	Wk 18	Wk 19	Final
Baylor	AP	18	17	21	21	19	18	24	23	23	18	RV	NV	RV	RV	NV					
Baylor	C	17	17	20	22	19	18	23	22	21	17	24	RV	RV	RV	RV	RV	RV	RV	RV	NV
Iowa State	AP	8	7	5	8	10	14	14	15	11	15	18	18	12	21	22	20	23	RV	17	
Iowa State	C	9	8	4	8	8	12	13	14	11	15	17	15	12	19	20	19	23	25	20	25
Kansas	AP	RV	RV	RV	RV	RV	22	20	22	21	23	RV	NV								
Kansas	C	RV	RV	NV		RV	24	24	25	25	25	RV	NV								RV
Kansas State	AP	RV	RV	25	RV	24	RV	RV	NV												
Kansas State	C			RV	RV	25	RV	RV	RV	NV											
Oklahoma	AP	15	16	RV	RV	23	24	23	20	17	19	15	14	20	16	15	13	16	14	16	
Oklahoma	C	16	16	22	23	20	20	18	18	16	16	12	12	17	13	12	11	13	12	14	17
Oklahoma State	AP															RV	RV	RV	NV		
Oklahoma State	C															RV	RV	NV			
TCU	AP																				
TCU	C																				
Texas	AP	3	3	19	22	RV	RV	RV	RV	RV	NV	25	RV	24	20	17	19	12	15	15	
Texas	C	3	5	16	18	RV	RV	RV	RV	RV	RV	25	RV	25	23	22	20	17	16	16	19
Texas Tech	AP																				
Texas Tech	C								RV	RV	RV	NV									
West Virginia	AP											RV	NV								
West Virginia	C																				

== Awards and honors ==
=== Players of the Week ===
Throughout the conference regular season, Big 12 Conference offices named two players (Player and Freshman) of the week each Monday.

Week	Player of the Week	School	Ref.	Freshman of the Week	School	Ref.
Nov. 14	Gabby Gregory	Kansas State		Bella Fontleroy	Baylor	
Nov. 21	Ashley Joens	Iowa State		Bailey Maupin	Texas Tech	
Nov. 28	Stephanie Soares	Iowa State		Jasmine Shavers	Texas Tech	
Dec. 5	Taylen Collins	Oklahoma State		Bella Fontleroy (2)	Baylor	
Dec. 12	DeYona Gaston	Texas		Darianna Littlepage-Buggs	Baylor	
Dec. 19	Zakiyah Franklin	Kansas		Denae Fritz	Iowa State	
Dec. 23	Madi Williams	Oklahoma		Bailey Maupin (2)	Texas Tech	
Jan. 3	Rori Harmon Taiyanna Jackson	Texas Kansas		Jasmine Shavers (2)	Texas Tech	
Jan. 9	Sarah Andrews	Baylor		Darianna Littlepage-Buggs (2)	Baylor	
Jan. 16	Naomie Alnatas Bre’Amber Scott	Oklahoma State Texas Tech		Jasmine Shavers (3)	Texas Tech	
Jan. 23	Madi Williams (2)	Oklahoma		Darianna Littlepage-Buggs (3)	Baylor	
Jan. 30	Ashley Joens (2)	Iowa State		Darianna Littlepage-Buggs (4)	Baylor	
Feb. 6	Sarah Andrews (2)	Baylor		Darianna Littlepage-Buggs (5)	Baylor	
Feb. 13	Taiyanna Jackson (2)	Kansas		Darianna Littlepage-Buggs (6)	Baylor	
Feb. 20	Ashley Joens (3)	Iowa State		Denae Fritz (2)	Iowa State	
Feb. 27	Serena Sundell	Kansas State		Darianna Littlepage-Buggs (7)	Baylor	
Mar. 6	Madisen Smith	West Virginia		Darianna Littlepage-Buggs (8)	Baylor	

School	PoW	FoW	Total
Baylor	2	10	12
Iowa State	4	2	6
Texas Tech	1	5	6
Kansas	3	—	3
Kansas State	2	—	2
Oklahoma	2	—	2
Oklahoma State	2	—	2
Texas	2	—	2
West Virginia	1	—	1

== Postseason ==
=== Big 12 Conference tournament ===
First round Thursday, March 9 ESPN+
8	Texas Tech	69
9	Kansas State	79
7	Kansas	52
10	TCU	57

Quarterfinals; Friday, March 10; ESPNU/ESPN+
1	Texas	60
9	Kansas State	42
4	Oklahoma State	62
5	West Virginia	61
2	Oklahoma	77
10	TCU	76
3	Iowa State	74
6	Baylor	63

Semifinals; Saturday, March 11; ESPN+
1	Texas	64
4	Oklahoma State	57
2	Oklahoma	72
3	Iowa State	82

Championship game Sunday, March 12; ESPN2
1	Texas	51
3	Iowa State	61

*denotes overtime

=== NCAA tournament ===
Six team from the conference were selected to participate.

Seed	Region	School	First Round	Second Round	Sweet Sixteen	Elite Eight	Final Four	Championship
No. 4	Seattle Regional 4	Texas	defeated No. 13 East Carolina 79–40	lost to No. 5 Louisville 51–73	—	—	—	—
No. 5	Seattle Regional 3	Iowa State	lost to No. 12 Toledo 73–80	—	—	—	—	—
No. 5	Greenville Regional 1	Oklahoma	defeated No. 12 Portland 85–63	lost to No. 4 UCLA 73–82	—	—	—	—
No. 7	Seattle Regional 3	Baylor	defeated No. 10 Alabama 78–74	lost to No. 2 UConn 58–77	—	—	—	—
No. 8	Greenville Regional 2	Oklahoma State	lost to No. 9 Miami (FL) 61–62	—	—	—	—	—
No. 10	Greenville Regional 1	West Virginia	lost to No. 7 Arizona 62–75	—	—	—	—	—
	6 Bids	W-L (%):	3–3 (.500)	0–3 (.000)	0–0 (–)	0–0 (–)	0–0 (–)	TOTAL: 3–6 (.333)

=== WNIT ===
Three teams from the conference were selected to participate: Kansas, Kansas State & Texas Tech.

Bracket	School	First Round	Second Round	Super Sixteen	Great Eight	Final Four	Championship
Region 2	Kansas	defeated Western Kentucky 86−72	defeated Missouri 75−47	defeated Nebraska 74−63	defeated Arkansas 78−64	defeated Washington 61−36	defeated Columbia 66−59
Region 1	Kansas State	defeated Wichita State 90−56	defeated Wyoming 71−55	lost to Washington 48−55	—	—	—
Region 2	Texas Tech	defeated UTEP 67−54	defeated SMU 61−49	lost to Arkansas 66−71	—	—	—
3 Bids	TOTAL W-L (%): 10–2 (.833)	3–0 (1.000)	3–0 (1.000)	1–2 (.333)	1–0 (1.000)	1–0 (1.000)	1–0 (1.000)

== WNBA draft ==
The Big 12 Conference had three players selected in the WNBA Draft. Stephanie Soares from Iowa State was the highest pick, selected by Washington Mystics on the 1st round 4th overall pick.

Player	Team	Round	Pick #	Position	School
Stephanie Soares	Washington Mystics	1	4	Forward	Iowa State
Madi Williams	Seattle Storm	2	18	Forward	Oklahoma
Ashley Joens	Dallas Wings	2	19	Shooting guard	Iowa State
