= 2022–23 Kansas State Wildcats women's basketball team =

Women's college basketball season

2022–23 Kansas State Wildcats women's basketball

WNIT, Super 16
- Conference: Big 12 Conference
- Record: 19–17 (5–13 Big 12)
- Head coach: Jeff Mittie (9th season)
- Assistant coaches: Brian Ostermann; Ebony Gilliam; Ebony Haliburton
- Home arena: Bramlage Coliseum

2022–23 Big 12 Conference women's basketball standings
	Conf.				Overall
Team	W		L	PCT	W		L	PCT
No. 15 Texas	14	–	4	.778	26	–	10	.722
No. 16 Oklahoma	14	–	4	.778	26	–	7	.788
No. 17 Iowa State†	11	–	7	.611	22	–	10	.688
Oklahoma State	10	–	8	.556	21	–	12	.636
West Virginia	10	–	8	.556	19	–	12	.613
Baylor	10	–	8	.556	20	–	13	.606
Kansas	9	–	9	.500	22	–	11	.667
Texas Tech	6	–	12	.333	20	–	15	.571
Kansas State	5	–	13	.278	19	–	16	.543
TCU	1	–	17	.056	8	–	23	.258
† 2023 Big 12 Tournament winner As of March 24, 2023; Rankings from AP poll

The 2022–23 Kansas State Wildcats women's basketball team represented Kansas State University in the 2022–23 NCAA Division I women's basketball season. The Wildcats were led by ninth-year head coach Jeff Mittie. They played their home games at Bramlage Coliseum in Manhattan, Kansas and were members of the Big 12 Conference.

== Previous season ==
They finished the season 20–13, 9–9 in Big 12 play and finished sixth in the conference. As the sixth seed in the Big 12 Tournament, they were defeated by the third seed Texas in the Quarterfinals. The Wildcats earned an at-large bid to the NCAA Tournament in the Bridgeport Regional as a nine seed with a matchup against eight seed Washington State. The Wildcats beat the Cougars 50–40. The Wildcats' second round matchup was against number one seed NC State; they were defeated by the Wolfpack 57–89.

== Roster ==
2022–23 Kansas State Wildcats women's basketball team
Players
Coaches

Pos.	#	Name	Height	Year	Previous school	Hometown
F	1	Sarah Shematsi	6 ft 2 in (1.88 m)	GS	Lycee Bellevue; South Plains College; LSU	Annecy, France
G	2	Ka'Mia Harris	5 ft 8 in (1.73 m)	Fr	DeSoto High School	Lancaster, TX
G	3	Jaelyn Glenn	6 ft 1 in (1.85 m)	So	The Barstow School	Kansas City, MO
G	4	Serena Sundell	6 ft 1 in (1.85 m)	So	Maryville	Maryville, MO
G	5	Brylee Glenn	6 ft 0 in (1.83 m)	So	The Barstow School	Kansas City, MO
G	10	Mikayla Parks	5 ft 9 in (1.75 m)	Fr	Norman High School	Norman, OK
G	14	Rebekah Dallinger	5 ft 9 in (1.75 m)	Jr	Narrabeen Sports High School; Miles Community College	Sydney, Australia
C	15	Heavenly Greer	6 ft 3 in (1.91 m)	RS So	Ganesha High School; Oklahoma	Phoenix, AZ
F	21	Eliza Maupin	6 ft 3 in (1.91 m)	Fr	Webster Groves High School	Webster Groves, MO
G	23	Mimi Gatewood	5 ft 6 in (1.68 m)	Fr	DeSoto High School	Glenn Heights, TX
G	24	Emilee Ebert	6 ft 0 in (1.83 m)	Sr	Frankfort High School	Frankfort, KS
F	30	Gisela Sanchez	6 ft 3 in (1.91 m)	So	Segle XXI; Arizona	Barcelona, Spain
C	41	Taylor Lauterbach	6 ft 7 in (2.01 m)	Jr	Appleton West	Appleton, WI
C	50	Ayoka Lee	6 ft 6 in (1.98 m)	RS Sr	Byron	Byron, MN

Head coach

- Jeff Mittie (Missouri Western)

Assistant coach(es)

- Brian Ostermann (UW–La Crosse)
- Ebony Gilliam (TCU)
- Ebony Haliburton (Oral Roberts)

Legend

- (C) Team captain
- (S) Suspended
- (I) Ineligible
- (W) Walk-on
- Injured
- Current redshirt

Roster

== Schedule and results ==
Date time, TV	Rank^{#}	Opponent^{#}	Result	Record	Site (attendance) city, state
Exhibition
October 31, 2022*; 6:30 pm, ESPN+		Fort Hays State	W 74–63	–	Bramlage Coliseum; Manhattan, KS
November 4, 2022*; 6:30 pm, ESPN+		Newman	W 104–47	–	Bramlage Coliseum; Manhattan, KS
Non-conference regular season
November 7, 2022*; 5:30 pm, ESPN+		Central Arkansas	W 83–43	1–0	Bramlage Coliseum (2,501); Manhattan, KS
November 11, 2022*; 3:30 pm, BTN		vs. Wisconsin; Brew City Battle	W 77–63	2–0	American Family Field; Milwaukee, WI
November 17, 2022*; 8:00 pm, ESPN+		No. 4 Iowa	W 84–83	3–0	Bramlage Coliseum (5,215); Manhattan, KS
November 18, 2022*; 6:30 pm, ESPN+		UTRGV	W 70–45	4–0	Bramlage Coliseum (2,598); Manhattan, KS
November 20, 2022*; 1:00 pm, ESPN+		Utah Tech	W 91–82	5–0	Bramlage Coliseum (2,477); Manhattan, KS
November 24, 2022*; 7:00 pm, ESPN3	No. 25	vs. Clemson; Paradise Jam	W 76–38	6–0	Sports and Fitness Center (1,024); St. Thomas USVI
November 25, 2022*; 4:45 pm, ESPN3	No. 25	vs. Northern Arizona; Paradise Jame	W 93–80	7–0	Sports and Fitness Center; St. Thomas USVI
November 26, 2022*; 7:00 pm, ESPN3	No. 25	vs. Arkansas; Paradise Jam	L 53–69	7–1	Sports and Fitness Center (2,024); St. Thomas USVI
December 4, 2022*; 1:00 pm, ESPN+		Houston	W 73–59	8–1	Bramlage Coliseum (2,612); Manhattan, KS
December 7, 2022*; 6:30 pm, ESPN+	No. 24	Kansas City	W 72–45	9–1	Bramlage Coliseum (2,593); Manhattan, KS
December 10, 2022*; 1:00 pm	No. 24	vs. South Dakota State	L 78–82	9–2	Municipal Auditorium (673); Kansas City, MO
December 18, 2022*; 1:00 pm, ESPN+		Northern Colorado	W 69–57	10–2	Bramlage Coliseum (2,506); Manhattan, KS
December 21, 2022*; 11:00 am, ESPN+		Morgan State	W 77–46	11–2	Bramlage Coliseum (2,337); Manhattan, KS
Big 12 regular season
December 31, 2022; 2:00 pm, LHN		at Texas	L 41–87	11–3 (0–1)	Moody Center (5,126); Austin, TX
January 4, 2023; 6:30 pm, ESPN+		Oklahoma State	W 86–72	12–3 (1–1)	Bramlage Coliseum (2,602); Manhattan, KS
January 7, 2023; 1:00 pm, ESPN+		West Virginia	L 70–77	12–4 (1–2)	Bramlage Coliseum (5,022); Manhattan, KS
January 11, 2023; 6:30 pm, ESPN+		at No. 15 Iowa State	L 56–67	12–5 (1–3)	Hilton Coliseum (9,263); Ames, IA
January 14, 2023; 4:00 pm, ESPN+		Texas Tech	L 65–85	12–6 (1–4)	Bramlage Coliseum (4,881); Manhattan, KS
January 18, 2023; 7:00 pm, ESPN+		at Baylor	L 48–69	12–7 (1–5)	Ferrell Center (4,011); Waco, TX
January 21, 2023; 6:30 pm, ESPN+		TCU	W 64–48	13–7 (2–5)	Bramlage Coliseum (3,114); Manhattan, KS
January 25, 2023; 6:30 pm, ESPN+		at Oklahoma State	L 74–82	13–8 (2–6)	Gallagher-Iba Arena (2,081); Stillwater, OK
January 29, 2023; 5:00 pm, ESPNU		at Kansas; Sunflower Showdown	L 72–85	13–9 (2–7)	Allen Fieldhouse (3,282); Lawrence, KS
February 1, 2023; 6:30 pm, ESPN+		No. 12 Iowa State	W 78–77	14–9 (3–7)	Bramlage Coliseum (4,132); Manhattan, KS
February 5, 2023; 1:00 pm, ESPNU		at Texas Tech	L 68–78	14–10 (3–8)	United Supermarkets Arena (3,971); Lubbock, TX
February 12, 2023; 1:00 pm, ESPNU		No. 16 Oklahoma	L 68–85	14–11 (3–9)	Bramlage Coliseum (4,138); Manhattan, KS
February 15, 2023; 6:30 pm, ESPN+		Baylor	W 87–68	15–11 (4–9)	Bramlage Coliseum (3,046); Manhattan, KS
February 18, 2023; 5:00 pm, ESPN+		at TCU	L 62–75	15–12 (4–10)	Schollmaier Arena (1,756); Fort Worth, TX
February 22, 2023; 6:30 pm, ESPN+		Kansas	W 63–45	16–12 (5–10)	Bramlage Coliseum (3,918); Manhattan, KS
February 25, 2023; 5:00 pm, ESPN+		at West Virginia	L 58–67	16–13 (5–11)	WVU Coliseum (2,425); Morgantown, WV
March 1, 2023; 6:00 pm, ESPN+		at No. 16 Oklahoma	L 86–90 ^{OT}	16–14 (5–12)	Lloyd Noble Center (3,251); Norman, OK
March 4, 2023; 4:00 pm, ESPN+		No. 23 Texas	L 52–80	16–15 (5–13)	Bramlage Coliseum (3,877); Manhattan, KS
Big 12 tournament
March 9, 2023; 5:00 p.m., ESPN+	(9)	vs. (8) Texas Tech; First Round	W 79–69	17–15	Municipal Auditorium; Kansas City, MO
March 10, 2023; 1:30 p.m., ESPNU	(9)	vs. (1) No. 15 Texas; Quarterfinals	L 42–60	17–16	Municipal Auditorium (5,238); Kansas City, MO
WNIT
March 16, 2023*; 6:00 p.m., ESPN+		Wichita State; First Round	W 90–56	18–16	Bramlage Coliseum (1,977); Manhattan, KS
March 21, 2023*; 6:00 p.m., ESPN+		Wyoming; Second Round	W 71–55	19–16	Bramlage Coliseum (2,350); Manhattan, KS
March 24, 2023*; 9:00 p.m.		at Washington; Super 16	L 48–55	19–17	Alaska Airlines Arena (3,245); Seattle, WA
*Non-conference game. ^{#}Rankings from AP Poll. (#) Tournament seedings in parentheses. All times are in Central Time.

== Rankings ==
Ranking movements Legend: ██ Increase in ranking ██ Decrease in ranking RV = Received votes
	Week																			
Poll	Pre	1	2	3	4	5	6	7	8	9	10	11	12	13	14	15	16	17	18	Final
AP	RV	RV	RV	25	RV	24	RV	RV												Not released
Coaches				RV	RV	25	RV	RV												

== See also ==
- 2022–23 Kansas State Wildcats men's basketball team
