= 2022–23 TCU Horned Frogs women's basketball team =

American college basketball season

2022–23 TCU Horned Frogs women's basketball
- Conference: Big 12 Conference
- Record: 8–23 (1–17 Big 12)
- Head coach: Raegan Pebley (9th season)
- Assistant coaches: Britney Brown; Taja Edwards; Rodney Hill
- Home arena: Schollmaier Arena

2022–23 Big 12 Conference women's basketball standings
	Conf.				Overall
Team	W		L	PCT	W		L	PCT
No. 15 Texas	14	–	4	.778	26	–	10	.722
No. 16 Oklahoma	14	–	4	.778	26	–	7	.788
No. 17 Iowa State†	11	–	7	.611	22	–	10	.688
Oklahoma State	10	–	8	.556	21	–	12	.636
West Virginia	10	–	8	.556	19	–	12	.613
Baylor	10	–	8	.556	20	–	13	.606
Kansas	9	–	9	.500	22	–	11	.667
Texas Tech	6	–	12	.333	20	–	15	.571
Kansas State	5	–	13	.278	19	–	16	.543
TCU	1	–	17	.056	8	–	23	.258
† 2023 Big 12 Tournament winner As of March 24, 2023; Rankings from AP poll

The 2022–23 TCU Horned Frogs women's basketball team represented Texas Christian University in the 2022–23 NCAA Division I women's basketball season. The 2021–22 season was head coach Raegan Pebley's ninth season at TCU. The Horned Frogs are members of the Big 12 Conference and played their home games in Schollmaier Arena.

== Previous season ==
The Horned Frogs finished the season 6–22, 2–16 in Big 12 play to finish in tenth place. In the Big 12 Tournament, they lost to West Virginia in the first round. They were not invited to the NCAA tournament or the WNIT.

== Offseason ==
=== Departures ===
TCU departures
Name	Number	Pos.	Height	Year	Hometown	Reason for departure
Caroline Germond	0	G	5'7"	Senior	Angers, France	Graduate transferred to James Madison
Aahliyah Jackson	1	G	5'10"	GS senior	Fort Smith, AR	Graduated
Okako Adika	4	G/F	6'0"	Senior	Holstebro, Denmark	Graduate transferred to USC
Yummy Morris	5	F	6'3"	Senior	North Little Rock, AR	Graduate transferred to San Diego State
Tavy Diggs	13	G	6'2"	Junior	Richardson, TX	Transferred to West Virginia
Aja Holmes	15	G	5'8"	Sophomore	Cibolo, TX	Transferred to Southern Illinois
Lauren Heard	20	G	5'9"	GS senior	Denton, TX	Graduated/went undrafted in 2022 WNBA draft
Michelle Berry	23	F	6'2"	GS senior	Miami, FL	Graduated
Kayla Mokwuah	24	C	6'4"	Senior	Longmeadow, MA	Graduate transferred to Arizona State

=== Incoming ===
TCU incoming transfers
Name	Num	Pos.	Height	Year	Hometown	Previous school
Tomi Taiwo	1	G	5'10"	Graduate student	Carmel, IN	Iowa
Emily Fisher	5	G	5'7"	Graduate student	Melbourne, Australia	American
Bre'Yon White	12	F	5'11"	Sophomore	Pearland, TX	Oklahoma
Bella Cravens	14	F	6'3"	Senior	Laie, HI	Nebraska
Lucy Ibeh	21	F	6'0"	Graduate student	Lagos, Nigeria	Central Arkansas
Roxane Makolo	30	G	5'10"	Senior	Saint-Hubert, QC	Purdue

==== Recruiting ====
There was no incoming recruiting class for 2022.

==== Recruiting class of 2023 ====
College recruiting (2023)
Name	Hometown	School	Height	Weight	Commit date
Victoria Flores; PG	Duncanville, TX	Duncanville High School	5 ft 7 in (1.70 m)	N/A	
Victoria Flores; PG	Recruit ratings: ESPN: (93)				
Jade Clack; W	Austin, TX	Austin High School	6 ft 1 in (1.85 m)	N/A	
Jade Clack; W	Recruit ratings: ESPN: (92)				
Overall recruit ranking:
Note: In many cases, Scout, Rivals, 247Sports, On3, and ESPN may conflict in their listings of height and weight.; In these cases, the average was taken. ESPN grades are on a 100-point scale.; Sources: "2023 Player Commits". ESPN. Archived from the original on February 10, 2023.

== Roster ==
2022–23 TCU Horned Frogs women's basketball team
Players
Coaches

Pos.	#	Name	Height	Year	Previous school	Hometown
G	1	Tomi Taiwo	5 ft 10 in (1.78 m)	GS	Carmel; Iowa	Carmel, IN
G	2	Tara Manumaleuga	5 ft 10 in (1.78 m)	Sr	Hillcrest Christian; Arizona	Gold Coast, QLD, Australia
G	3	Mariah Roberts	5 ft 8 in (1.73 m)	RS Fr	Martin	Fort Worth, TX
G	5	Emily Fisher	5 ft 7 in (1.7 m)	Sr	Emmaus College; American	Melbourne, Australia
G	11	Knisha Godfrey	5 ft 9 in (1.75 m)	RS Fr	Tampa Bay Technical; Mississippi State	Tampa, FL
F	12	Bre'yon White	5 ft 11 in (1.8 m)	So	Shadow Creek; Oklahoma	Pearland, TX
G	15	Paige Bradley	5 ft 10 in (1.78 m)	So	Bishop Lynch	Dallas, TX
F	21	Lucy Ibeh	6 ft 0 in (1.83 m)	GS	North Central Texas Academy; Central Arkansas	Pearland, TX
F	22	Evie Goetz	6 ft 1 in (1.85 m)	RS Fr	Guyer	Denton, TX
F	23	Aaliyah Roberson	6 ft 2 in (1.88 m)	Fr	Clark	San Antonio, TX
F	24	Daija Turner	6 ft 3 in (1.91 m)	RS Fr	Village Christian Academy	Fayetteville, NC
G	30	Roxane Makolo	5 ft 10 in (1.78 m)	Sr	Dawson College	Saint-Hubert, QC
F	32	Patricia Morris	6 ft 7 in (2.01 m)	Sr	Duarte; Oregon State	Duarte, CA

Head coach

- Raegan Pebley (Colorado)

Assistant coach(es)

- Britney Brown (Oklahoma)
- Taja Edwards (Fresno State)
- Rodney Hill (Texas A&M)

Legend

- (C) Team captain
- (S) Suspended
- (I) Ineligible
- (W) Walk-on
- Injured
- Current redshirt

Roster

== Schedule and results ==
Date time, TV	Rank^{#}	Opponent^{#}	Result	Record	High points	High rebounds	High assists	Site (attendance) city, state
Non-conference regular season
November 7, 2022*; 12:00 p.m., ESPN+		Lipscomb	W 69–62	1–0	26 – Godfrey	8 – Godfrey	4 – Fisher	Schollmaier Arena (1,279); Fort Worth, TX
November 12, 2022*; 12:00 p.m., ACCNX		at No. 12 North Carolina	L 48–75	1–1	15 – Taiwo	5 – Cravens	4 – Fisher	Carmichael Arena (2,015); Chapel Hill, NC
November 16, 2022*; 6:30 p.m., ESPN+		UTSA	W 74–67	2–1	18 – Taiwo	12 – Cravens	7 – Fisher	Schollmaier Arena (1,480); Fort Worth, TX
November 20, 2022*; 1:00 p.m., ESPN+		South Florida; Maggie Dixon Classic	L 59–66	2–2	18 – Taiwo	7 – Fisher	2 – Tied	Schollmaier Arena; Fort Worth, TX
November 23, 2022*; 6:30 p.m., ESPN+		Sam Houston	L 54–60	2–3	14 – Taiwo	10 – Ibeh	2 – Tied	Schollmaier Arena (1,474); Fort Worth, TX
November 29, 2022*; 12:00 p.m., ESPN+		Incarnate Word	W 60–33	3–3	17 – Ibeh	9 – Ibeh	7 – Fisher	Schollmaier Arena (2,108); Fort Worth, TX
December 2, 2022*; 7:00 p.m., ESPN+		at Rice	L 58–68	3–4	17 – Ibeh	6 – Ibeh	2 – Tied	Tudor Fieldhouse (792); Houston, TX
December 5, 2022*; 6:30 p.m., ESPN+		George Washington	W 70–58	4–4	20 – Taiwo	6 – Cravens	4 – Fisher	Schollmaier Arena (1,358); Fort Worth, TX
December 9, 2022*; 6:00 p.m., ESPN+		Missouri State	L 59–63	4–5	20 – Taiwo	10 – White	4 – Tied	Schollmaier Arena (1,424); Fort Worth, TX
December 18, 2022*; 1:00 p.m., ESPN+		Grambling State	W 56–45	5–5	11 – Taiwo	9 – Cravens	3 – Makolo	Schollmaier Arena (1,436); Fort Worth, TX
December 21, 2022*; 1:00 p.m., ESPN+		Nicholls	W 75–32	6–5	12 – Taiwo	11 – White	4 – Tied	Schollmaier Arena (1,323); Fort Worth, TX
Big 12 regular season
December 31, 2022; 2:00 p.m., ESPN+		at No. 23 Baylor	L 42–64	6–6 (0–1)	9 – Ibeh	10 – Cravens	2 – Tied	Ferrell Center (4,385); Waco, TX
January 4, 2023; 6:30 p.m., ESPN+		Texas	L 69–81	6–7 (0–2)	17 – Godfrey	9 – Cravens	3 – Tied	Schollmaier Arena (2,137); Fort Worth, TX
January 7, 2023; 5:00 p.m., ESPN+		Texas Tech	L 70–78	6–8 (0–3)	33 – Taiwo	10 – Makolo	5 – Fisher	Schollmaier Arena (2,507); Fort Worth, TX
January 10, 2023; 6:00 p.m., ESPN+		at West Virginia	L 45–77	6–9 (0–4)	13 – Ibeh	7 – Ibeh	1 – Tied	WVU Coliseum (1,267); Morgantown, WV
January 14, 2023; 2:00 p.m., ESPN+		at Oklahoma State	L 70–80	6–10 (0–5)	25 – Taiwo	11 – Ibeh	5 – Fisher	Gallagher-Iba Arena (2,540); Stillwater, OK
January 18, 2023; 6:30 p.m., ESPN+		No. 15 Oklahoma	L 66–93	6–11 (0–6)	13 – Ibeh	6 – Cravens	5 – Fisher	Schollmaier Arena; Fort Worth, TX
January 21, 2023; 6:30 p.m., ESPN+		at Kansas State	L 48–64	6–12 (0–7)	13 – Taiwo	10 – Cravens	6 – Fisher	Bramlage Coliseum (3,114); Manhattan, KS
January 25, 2023; 6:30 p.m., ESPN+		No. 18 Iowa State	L 35–75	6–13 (0–8)	9 – Roberson	6 – Tied	4 – Fisher	Schollmaier Arena (2,016); Fort Worth, TX
January 28, 2023; 1:00 p.m., ESPN+		West Virginia	L 55–62	6–14 (0–9)	18 – Ibeh	8 – Ibeh	7 – Fisher	Schollmaier Arena (2,314); Fort Worth, TX
January 31, 2023; 6:00 p.m., ESPN+		at No. 20 Oklahoma	L 78–101	6–15 (0–10)	22 – Taiwo	5 – Tied	7 – Fisher	Lloyd Noble Center (2,736); Norman, OK
February 4, 2023; 1:00 p.m., ESPN+		Oklahoma State	L 65–77	6–16 (0–11)	19 – Tied	6 – Makolo	6 – Fisher	Schollmaier Arena (2,540); Fort Worth, TX
February 8, 2023; 7:00 p.m., ESPN+		at Kansas	L 55–73	6–17 (0–12)	14 – Taiwo	5 – Tied	3 – Fisher	Allen Fieldhouse (2,264); Lawrence, KS
February 11, 2023; 4:00 p.m., LHN		at No. 20 Texas	L 50–70	6–18 (0–13)	15 – Taiwo	8 – Ibeh	3 – Taiwo	Moody Center (6,877); Austin, TX
February 18, 2023; 5:00 p.m., ESPN+		Kansas State	W 75–62	7–18 (1–13)	21 – Ibeh	10 – Tied	7 – Fisher	Schollmaier Arena (1,756); Fort Worth, TX
February 22, 2023; 6:30 p.m., ESPN+		Baylor	L 57–67	7–19 (1–14)	17 – Taiwo	6 – Cravens	5 – Fisher	Schollmaier Arena (2,023); Fort Worth, TX
February 25, 2023; 5:00 p.m., ESPN+		at No. 20 Iowa State	L 56–84	7–20 (1–15)	13 – Taiwo	7 – Cravens	2 – Tied	Hilton Coliseum (11,227); Ames, IA
March 1, 2023; 7:00 p.m., ESPN+		at Texas Tech	L 49–66	7–21 (1–16)	14 – Ibeh	6 – Cravens	3 – Taiwo	United Supermarkets Arena (3,819); Lubbock, TX
March 4, 2023; 1:00 p.m., ESPN+		Kansas	L 61–84	7–22 (1–17)	19 – Taiwo	7 – Cravens	3 – Tied	Schollmaier Arena (1,885); Fort Worth, TX
Big 12 Women's Tournament
March 9, 2023; 7:30 p.m., ESPN+	(10)	vs. (7) Kansas; First Round	W 57–52	8–22	13 – Taiwo	14 – Cravens	3 – Taiwo	Municipal Auditorium (4,186); Kansas City, MO
March 10, 2023; 5:00 p.m., ESPN+	(10)	vs. (2) No. 14 Oklahoma; Quarterfinals	L 76–77	8–23	24 – Ibeh	7 – Cravens	7 – Manumaleuga	Municipal Auditorium; Kansas City, MO
*Non-conference game. ^{#}Rankings from AP Poll. (#) Tournament seedings in parentheses. All times are in Central Time.

== Rankings ==
Ranking movements Legend: — = Not ranked
	Week																			
Poll	Pre	1	2	3	4	5	6	7	8	9	10	11	12	13	14	15	16	17	18	Final
AP	—	—	—	—	—	—	—	—	—	—	—	—	—	—	—					
Coaches	—	—	—	—	—	—	—	—	—	—	—	—	—	—	—					

The Coaches Poll did not release a Week 2 poll and the AP Poll did not release a poll after the NCAA Tournament.
