= 2022–23 Texas Tech Lady Raiders basketball team =

Women's college basketball season

2022–23 Texas Tech Lady Raiders basketball

Preseason WNIT champions

WNIT, Super 16
- Conference: Big 12 Conference
- Record: 20–15 (6–12 Big 12)
- Head coach: Krista Gerlich (3rd season)
- Assistant coaches: JC Carter; Ashley Crawford; Plenette Pierson
- Home arena: United Supermarkets Arena

2022–23 Big 12 Conference women's basketball standings
	Conf.				Overall
Team	W		L	PCT	W		L	PCT
No. 15 Texas	14	–	4	.778	26	–	10	.722
No. 16 Oklahoma	14	–	4	.778	26	–	7	.788
No. 17 Iowa State†	11	–	7	.611	22	–	10	.688
Oklahoma State	10	–	8	.556	21	–	12	.636
West Virginia	10	–	8	.556	19	–	12	.613
Baylor	10	–	8	.556	20	–	13	.606
Kansas	9	–	9	.500	22	–	11	.667
Texas Tech	6	–	12	.333	20	–	15	.571
Kansas State	5	–	13	.278	19	–	16	.543
TCU	1	–	17	.056	8	–	23	.258
† 2023 Big 12 Tournament winner As of March 24, 2023; Rankings from AP poll

The 2022–23 Texas Tech Lady Raiders basketball team represented Texas Tech University in the 2022–23 NCAA Division I women's basketball season. The Lady Raiders were led by third-year head coach Krista Gerlich. They played their home games at United Supermarkets Arena and competed as members of the Big 12 Conference.

== Previous season ==
The Lady Raiders finished the season 11-19, 4-14 in Big 12 play to finish in eighth place. They lost to Oklahoma State in the Big 12 Tournament. They were not invited to the NCAA tournament or the WNIT.

== Roster ==
2022–23 Texas Tech Lady Raiders women's basketball team
Players
Coaches

Pos.	#	Name	Height	Year	Previous school	Hometown
C	1	Ella Tofaeono	6 ft 3 in (1.91 m)	Jr	Midland; Texas A&M	Sydney, Australia
G/F	2	Kilah Freelon	6 ft 1 in (1.85 m)	Fr	Mullen	Denver, CO
G	3	Jasmine Shavers	5 ft 8 in (1.73 m)	RS Fr	Dr. John Horn; Mississippi State	Mesquite, TX
F/C	4	JoJo Nworie	6 ft 5 in (1.96 m)	So	Southern Idaho	Lagos, Nigeria
G	5	Rhyle McKinney	5 ft 9 in (1.75 m)	So	Argyle; SMU	Argyle, TX
F	10	Bryn Gerlich	6 ft 0 in (1.83 m)	Sr	Colleyville Heritage; Oklahoma State	Colleyville, TX
G	11	Saga Ukkonen	5 ft 9 in (1.75 m)	So	Mäkelänrinne	Helsinki, Finland
F	14	Lana Wenger	6 ft 4 in (1.93 m)	So	Futures Academy	Hersberg, Switzerland
G	20	Bailey Maupin	5 ft 10 in (1.78 m)	Fr	Gruver	Gruver, TX
G	23	Bre'Amber Scott	5 ft 11 in (1.8 m)	Sr	Little Rock Central; Mississippi State; Little Rock	Little Rock, AR
G	25	Ashley Chevalier	5 ft 7 in (1.7 m)	So	Sierra Canyon; Texas	Chatsworth, CA
G	32	Tatum Veitenheimer	5 ft 8 in (1.73 m)	Sr	Windthorst; Oklahoma	Windthorst, TX
G/F	41	Katie Ferrell	6 ft 1 in (1.85 m)	Sr	Plano; UT Arlington	Plano, TX
C	42	Jazmaine Lewis	6 ft 4 in (1.93 m)	Jr	Center; Houston	Kansas City, MO

Head coach

- Krista Gerlich (Texas Tech)

Assistant coach(es)

- JC Carter (Southwest Baptist)
- Ashley Crawford (Lamar)
- Plenette Pierson (Texas Tech)

Legend

- (C) Team captain
- (S) Suspended
- (I) Ineligible
- (W) Walk-on
- Injured
- Current redshirt

Roster

== Schedule ==
Date time, TV	Rank^{#}	Opponent^{#}	Result	Record	Site (attendance) city, state
Exhibition
November 1, 2022*; 7:00 p.m.		Midwestern State	W 84–50		United Supermarkets Arena; Lubbock, TX
Non-conference regular season (12-1)
November 7, 2022*; 5:30 p.m., ESPN+		Texas A&M–Corpus Christi	W 69–49	1–0	United Supermarkets Arena (5,562); Lubbock, TX
November 15, 2022*; 7:00 p.m., ESPN+		Jackson State; 2022 Preseason WNIT	L 63-69	1–1	United Supermarkets Arena (3,280); Lubbock, TX
November 16, 2022*; 7:00 p.m., ESPN+		Colorado; 2022 Preseason WNIT	W 86–85 ^{OT}	2–1	United Supermarkets Arena (3,316); Lubbock, TX
November 20, 2022*; 4:00 p.m., ESPN+		at Louisiana; 2022 Preseason WNIT	W 64–48	3–1	Cajundome (517); Lafayette, LA
November 25, 2022*; 1:00 p.m., FloSports		vs. Middle Tennessee; Las Vegas Invitational	W 72–67	4–1	The Mirage; Las Vegas, NV
November 26, 2022*; 10:00 p.m., FloSports		vs. Mercer; Las Vegas Invitational	W 78–66	5–1	The Mirage; Las Vegas, NV
December 1, 2022*; 7:00 p.m., ESPN+		Alabama State	W 91–56	6–1	United Supermarkets Arena (3,341); Lubbock, TX
December 4, 2022*; 2:00 p.m., ESPN+		Incarnate Word	W 66–48	7–1	United Supermarkets Arena (4,297); Lubbock, TX
December 6, 2022*; 11:30 a.m., ESPN+		Sam Houston State	W 68–55	8–1	United Supermarkets Arena (13,306); Lubbock, TX
December 14, 2022*; 7:00 p.m., ESPN+		Oral Roberts	W 82–68	9–1	United Supermarkets Arena (3,352); Lubbock, TX
December 19, 2022*; 7:00 p.m., ESPN+		McNeese State	W 66–47	10–1	United Supermarkets Arena (4,511); Lubbock, TX
December 22, 2022*; 2:00 p.m., ESPN+		UC Riverside	W 59–38	11–1	United Supermarkets Arena (3,979); Lubbock, TX
December 27, 2022*; 2:00 p.m., ESPN+		Mississippi Valley State	W 68–45	12–1	United Supermarkets Arena (4,281); Lubbock, TX
Big 12 regular season (6-11)
December 31, 2022; 2:00 p.m., ESPN+		No. 15 Iowa State	L 58–81	12–2 (0–1)	United Supermarkets Arena (5,868); Lubbock, TX
January 4, 2023; 7:00 p.m., ESPN+		at No. 21 Kansas	L 59–77	12–3 (0–2)	Allen Fieldhouse (3,038); Lawrence, KS
January 7, 2023; 5:00 p.m., ESPN+		at TCU	W 78–70	13–3 (1–2)	Schollmaier Arena (2,507); Fort Worth, TX
January 11, 2023; 7:00 p.m., ESPN+		No. 19 Oklahoma	L 79–89	13–4 (1–3)	United Supermarkets Arena (4,098); Lubbock, TX
January 14, 2023; 4:00 p.m., ESPN+		at Kansas State	W 85–65	14–4 (2–3)	Bramlage Coliseum (4,881); Manhattan, KS
January 18, 2023; 7:00 p.m., ESPN+		No. 25 Texas	W 68–64	15–4 (3–3)	United Supermarkets Arena (5,604); Lubbock, TX
January 21, 2023; 12:00 p.m., ESPN+		at West Virginia	L 57–67	15–5 (3–4)	WVU Coliseum (2,710); Morgantown, WV
January 28, 2023; 2:00 p.m., ESPN+		Baylor	L 59–79	15–6 (3–5)	United Supermarkets Arena (8,235); Lubbock, TX
February 1, 2023; 6:30 p.m., ESPN+		at Oklahoma State	L 74–86	15–7 (3–6)	Gallagher-Iba Arena (1,901); Stillwater, OK
February 5, 2023; 1:00 p.m., ESPNU		Kansas State	W 78–68	16–7 (4–6)	United Supermarkets Arena (3,971); Lubbock, TX
February 8, 2023; 7:00 p.m., ESPN+		at No. 20 Texas	L 71–80	16–8 (4–7)	Moody Center (5,571); Austin, TX
February 11, 2023; 2:00 p.m., ESPN+		Kansas	L 67–78	16–9 (4–8)	United Supermarkets Arena (4,217); Lubbock, TX
February 15, 2023; 6:00 p.m., ESPN+		at No. 15 Oklahoma	L 57–84	16–10 (4–9)	Lloyd Noble Center (2,931); Norman, OK
February 18, 2023; 2:00 p.m., ESPN+		Oklahoma State	L 80–92 ^{3OT}	16–11 (4–10)	United Supermarkets Arena (6,070); Lubbock, TX
February 22, 2023; 7:00 p.m., ESPN+		West Virginia	W 69–68 ^{2OT}	17–11 (5–10)	United Supermarkets Arena (3,711); Lubbock, TX
February 25, 2023; 5:00 p.m., ESPN+		at Baylor	L 61–71	17–12 (5–11)	Ferrell Center (5,210); Waco, TX
March 1, 2023; 7:00 p.m., ESPN+		TCU	W 66–49	18–12 (6–11)	United Supermarkets Arena (3,815); Lubbock, TX
March 4, 2023; 3:00 p.m., ESPN+		at No. 23 Iowa State	L 52–76	18–13 (6–12)	Hilton Coliseum (11,858); Ames, IA
Big 12 tournament
March 9, 2023; 5:00 p.m., ESPN+	(8)	vs. (9) Kansas State; First Round	L 69–79	18–14	Municipal Auditorium; Kansas City, MO
WNIT
March 16, 2023; 6:00 p.m., ESPN+		UTEP; First Round	W 67–54	19–14	United Supermarkets Arena (4,159); Lubbock, TX
March 20, 2023; 6:00 p.m., ESPN+		SMU; Second Round	W 61–49	20–14	United Supermarkets Arena (4,412); Lubbock, TX
March 24, 2023; 7:00 p.m., SECN+		at Arkansas; Super 16	L 66–71	20–15	Bud Walton Arena (3,560); Fayetteville, AR
*Non-conference game. ^{#}Rankings from AP Poll. (#) Tournament seedings in parentheses. All times are in Central Time.

== Rankings ==
+ Regular season polls	Poll	Pre- season	Week 2	Week 3	Week 4	Week 5	Week 6	Week 7	Week 8	Week 9	Week 10	Week 11	Week 12	Week 13	Week 14	Week 15	Week 16	Final
AP	NR	NR	NR	NR	NR	NR	NR	NR	NR	NR	NR							
Coaches	NR	NR	NR	NR	NR	NR	NR	RV	RV	RV	NR							

Legend
	Increase in ranking
	Decrease in ranking
	Not ranked previous week
(RV)	Received votes
(NR)	Not ranked and did not receive votes

== See also ==
- 2022–23 Texas Tech Red Raiders basketball team
