= Lexi Donarski =

American basketball player (born 2002)

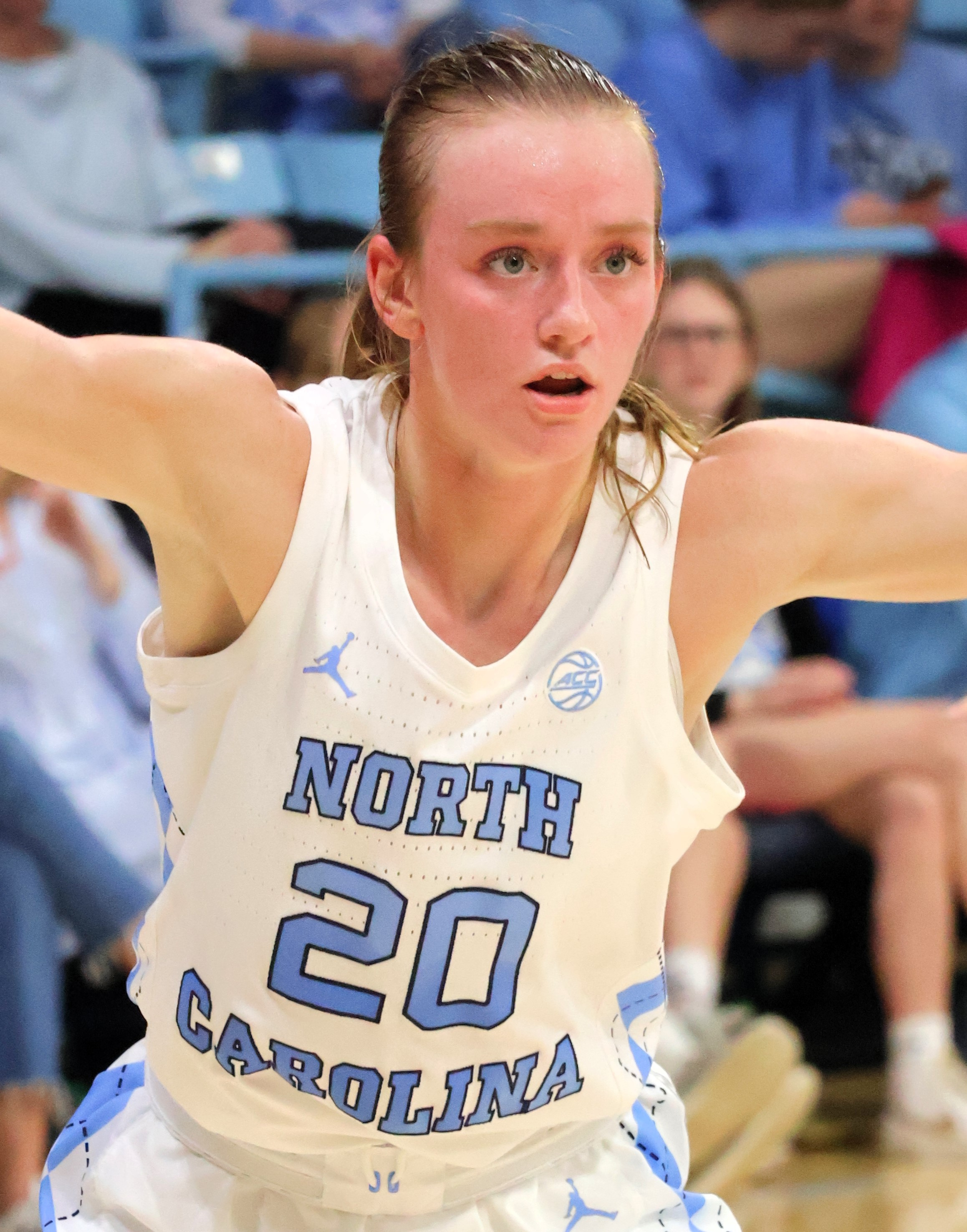
- Donarski with North Carolina in 2024

No. 20 – TFSE-MTK
- Position: Guard
- League: Nemzeti Bajnokság I/A

Personal information
- Born: January 11, 2002 (age 24)
- Listed height: 6 ft 0 in (1.83 m)

Career information
- High school: Aquinas High School (La Crosse, Wisconsin)
- College: Iowa State (2020–2023); North Carolina (2023–present)
- WNBA draft: 2025: undrafted
- Playing career: 2025–present

Career history
- 2025–: TFSE-MTK

Career highlights
- Big 12 Defensive Player of the Year (2022); First-team All-Big 12 (2022); 2x Big 12 All-Defensive Team (2022, 2023); Big 12 Freshman of the Year (2021); Big 12 All-Freshman Team (2021); McDonald's All-American (2020); Wisconsin Miss Basketball (2020)

Alexis Marie Donarski (born January 11, 2002) is an American professional basketball player for TFSE-MTK of the Hungarian A Division. She played college basketball for the Iowa State Cyclones and the North Carolina Tar Heels. In the 2021–22 season, she was named the Big 12 Conference Defensive Player of the Year with the Cyclones.

== Early life and high school career ==
Donarski was raised in Onalaska, Wisconsin, one of two daughters born to Dave and Pam Donarski. Her sister, Macy, plays college basketball for Montana. Donarski's parents had her practicing basketball from a young age, working on her defense from the age of four, and she played up two age levels from the first grade. When she was 14, she committed to Iowa State, which she grew up a fan of, when head coach Bill Fennelly offered her a scholarship as an eighth grader. Donarski attended Aquinas High School in La Crosse, Wisconsin, where she led the basketball team to two state championships and an overall record of 107–3. She averaged 24.2 points, 6.9 assists, 5.5 steals and 4.5 rebounds per game in her senior year, being named the Wisconsin Gatorade Player of the Year and Wisconsin Miss Basketball. She also played for Wisconsin Flight Elite, which now goes by Team PRIME Nation of the GIRLS NIKE EYBL (EYBL). Donarski was ranked as a five-star recruit and the 12th-best player of the 2020 class, making her the highest-ranked recruit in Iowa State history.

== College career ==
=== Iowa State Cyclones ===
==== Freshman season (2020–21) ====
Donarski debuted for the Iowa State Cyclones on November 25, 2020, scoring 5 points in a 69–43 win against Omaha. She earned a starting position from the outset and was responsible for guarding the opposing team's top offensive player. On December 12, she scored a team-high 25 points with 7 rebounds in an 85–64 win against North Dakota State. She shot 7-for-9 from three for 25 points in a 99–72 win against Texas Tech on January 10, 2021. She posted a career-high 32 points in a 92–81 win against TCU on February 13. In the NCAA tournament, she scored 18 points for No. 7 seed Iowa State in an 84–82 loss to No. 2 Texas A&M in the second round. As a freshman, she averaged 13.0 points (the most of any Big 12 freshman), 3.3 rebounds, and 2.0 assists per game. She shot 41.1 percent from distance for a team-high 53 made threes. She became the second Cyclone to be named Big 12 Freshman of the Year after Megan Taylor in 1998.

==== Sophomore season (2021–22) ====
As a sophomore, Donarski averaged 14.3 points and 3.3 rebounds per game. She kept her main conference defensive targets—who had averaged 14.7 points per game on 40.9 percent shooting—to 9.3 points and 30.0 percent. On December 8, 2021, she helped hold Caitlin Clark to 26 points on 10-for-26 shooting in a 77–70 win against Iowa, which marked Iowa State's first win over the rival since 2015. She received first-team All-Big 12 honors and became the first Cyclone to be named Big 12 Defensive Player of the Year. She led the No. 3 Cyclones with 20 points in a 67–44 win against No. 6 Georgia in the second round of the NCAA tournament on March 20, 2022. She scored 11 points as they were upset 76–68 by No. 10 Creighton in the third round.

==== Junior season (2022–23) ====
On March 11, 2023, Donarski scored 20 points on 7-for-11 shooting, including 3-of-3 from three, in an 82–72 win against Oklahoma State in the semifinals of the Big 12 Conference tournament. She added 9 points in a 61–51 win against Texas in the conference final on March 12 as Iowa State won the conference tournament for the first time since 2001. Donarski averaged 11.7 points per game and was named to the all-tournament team. On March 18, she scored 13 points as No. 5 Iowa State was upset 80–73 by No. 12 Toledo in the first round of the NCAA tournament. As a junior, she averaged 12.1 points, 2.9 rebounds, and 2.6 assists and was named to the Big 12 all-defensive team for a second time. On March 24, she announced that she was leaving Iowa State and entered the NCAA transfer portal and was considered the third-best transfer recruit.

=== North Carolina Tar Heels ===
==== Senior season (2023–24) ====
Donarski announced that she would transfer to the North Carolina Tar Heels on April 24, 2023. She debuted for the Tar Heels on November 8, scoring 14 points in a 102–49 win against Gardner–Webb. She scored a season-high 23 points in an 80–70 win against NC State on February 22, 2024. She was held to 7 points in an 88–41 blowout loss to eventual champions No. 1 South Carolina in the second round of the NCAA tournament. As a senior, she averaged 10.5 points and 2.8 rebounds per game in her senior season.

==== Fifth year (2024–25) ====
Donarski announced on April 11, 2024, that she would return to North Carolina for her fifth year of eligibility. On March 6, 2025, she scored 20 points in a 78–71 win against Boston College during the ACC tournament, where North Carolina reached the semifinals. She helped North Carolina earn a three seed in the NCAA tournament, hosting tournament games at home for the first time in ten years. She sank five three-pointers in a game six times during the season, including in a 70–49 win against Oregon State in the first round of the NCAA tournament, where the Tar Heels would make the third round. She was the only player to start all 37 games for North Carolina and averaged 10.7 points and 1.9 rebounds per game as a graduate student. Her total of 86 three-pointers made in the season ranked fifth in program history.

== Professional career ==
=== TFSE-MTK ===
On June 23, 2025, it was announced that Donarski had signed with Hungarian club TFSE-MTK.

== Career statistics ==
Legend
GP	Games played	GS	Games started	MPG	Minutes per game	RPG	Rebounds per game
APG	Assists per game	SPG	Steals per game	BPG	Blocks per game	PPG	Points per game
TO	Turnovers per game	FG%	Field-goal percentage	3P%	3-point field-goal percentage	FT%	Free-throw percentage
**Bold**	Career best	°	League leader

=== College ===
Year	Team	GP	GS	MPG	FG%	3P%	FT%	RPG	APG	SPG	BPG	TO	PPG
2020–21	Iowa State	28	28	33.2	40.5	**41.1**	86.3	**3.3**	2.0	0.5	0.3	1.9	13.0
2021–22	Iowa State	35	35	**36.1**	38.1	37.1	84.6	3.3	1.8	0.8	**0.4**	1.8	**14.3**
2022–23	Iowa State	32	32	35.5	38.0	31.8	**86.7**	2.9	**2.6**	**1.0**	0.2	1.5	12.1
2023–24	UNC	33	32	35.9	35.7	33.9	85.0	2.8	1.3	0.9	0.1	1.1	10.5
2024–25	UNC	**37**	**37**	29.9	**42.3**	39.8	67.7	1.9	1.4	**1.0**	0.2	**0.8**	10.7
**Career**		165	164	34.1	38.8	36.6	83.7	2.8	1.8	0.9	0.2	1.4	12.1
Statistics retrieved from Sports-Reference.
