= 2022–23 West Virginia Mountaineers women's basketball team =

Intercollegiate basketball season

2022–23 West Virginia Mountaineers women's basketball

NCAA Tournament, First Round
- Conference: Big 12 Conference
- Record: 19–12 (10–8 Big 12)
- Head coach: Dawn Plitzuweit (1st season)
- Associate head coach: Jason Jeschke (1st season)
- Assistant coaches: Aaron Horn (1st season); Ariel Braker (1st season)
- Home arena: WVU Coliseum

2022–23 Big 12 Conference women's basketball standings
	Conf.				Overall
Team	W		L	PCT	W		L	PCT
No. 15 Texas	14	–	4	.778	26	–	10	.722
No. 16 Oklahoma	14	–	4	.778	26	–	7	.788
No. 17 Iowa State†	11	–	7	.611	22	–	10	.688
Oklahoma State	10	–	8	.556	21	–	12	.636
West Virginia	10	–	8	.556	19	–	12	.613
Baylor	10	–	8	.556	20	–	13	.606
Kansas	9	–	9	.500	22	–	11	.667
Texas Tech	6	–	12	.333	20	–	15	.571
Kansas State	5	–	13	.278	19	–	16	.543
TCU	1	–	17	.056	8	–	23	.258
† 2023 Big 12 Tournament winner As of March 24, 2023; Rankings from AP poll

The 2022–23 West Virginia Mountaineers women's basketball team represented West Virginia University during the 2022–23 NCAA Division I women's basketball season. The Mountaineers, led by first-year head coach Dawn Plitzuweit, played their home games at WVU Coliseum and are members of the Big 12 Conference.

== Previous season ==
The Mountaineers finished the season 15–15, 7–11 in Big 12 play to finish in seventh place. In the Big 12 Tournament, they defeated TCU in the first round, before losing to Iowa State in the quarterfinals. They were not invited to the NCAA tournament or the WNIT.

== Offseason ==
=== Departures ===
West Virginia Departures
Name	Number	Pos.	Height	Year	Hometown	Reason for Departure
Kristen Deans	3	G	5'8"	Junior	Greensboro, NC	Transferred to Florida
Jasmine Carson	5	G	5'10"	Senior	Memphis, TN	Graduate transferred to LSU
Esmery Martínez	12	F	6'2"	Junior	Hato Mayor del Rey, DR	Transferred to Arizona
Kari Niblack	14	F	6'1"	Senior	Leesburg, FL	Graduate transferred to Georgia
Yemiyah Morris	20	C	6'6"	GS Senior	San Bernardino, CA	Graduated
Blessing Ejiofor	22	C	6'5"	GS Senior	Ebonyi, Nigeria	Graduated
Jeanna Cunningham	33	C	6'4"	Sophomore	Brentwood, NY	Transferred to Alabama

=== Incoming ===
West Virginia incoming transfers
Name	Num	Pos.	Height	Year	Hometown	Previous School
Sarah Bates	3	G	5'9"	GS Senior	McDonough, GA	Georgia Tech
Danni Nichols	4	G	5'10"	GS Senior	Columbia, MO	Western Illinois
Kylee Blacksten	14	G	6'3"	Sophomore	Colorado Springs, CO	Colorado
Tavy Diggs	21	G	6'1"	Senior	Richardson, TX	TCU
Kyah Watson	32	G	5'10"	(redshirt) Sophomore	Rapid City, SD	South Dakota

==== Recruiting ====
College recruiting information
Name	Hometown	School	Height	Weight	Commit date
Imarianah Russell; G	Dublin, OH	Reynoldsburg High School	6 ft 0 in (1.83 m)	N/A	
Imarianah Russell; G	Recruit ratings: ESPN: (91)				
Overall recruit ranking:
Note: In many cases, Scout, Rivals, 247Sports, On3, and ESPN may conflict in their listings of height and weight.; In these cases, the average was taken. ESPN grades are on a 100-point scale.; Sources: "2023 Player Commits". ESPN. Archived from the original on February 20, 2023.

==== Recruiting class of 2023 ====
College recruiting information (2023)
Name	Hometown	School	Height	Weight	Commit date
Grace Grocholski; G	Kettle, WI	Kettle Moraine High School	5 ft 10 in (1.78 m)	N/A	
Grace Grocholski; G	Recruit ratings: ESPN: (91)				
Overall recruit ranking:
Note: In many cases, Scout, Rivals, 247Sports, On3, and ESPN may conflict in their listings of height and weight.; In these cases, the average was taken. ESPN grades are on a 100-point scale.; Sources: "2023 Player Commits". ESPN. Archived from the original on February 20, 2023.

== Roster ==
2022–23 West Virginia Mountaineers women's basketball team
Players
Coaches

Pos.	#	Name	Height	Year	Previous school	Hometown
G	00	Jayla Hemingway	5 ft 11 in (1.8 m)	Sr	Houston; Mississippi State	Collierville, TN
G	2	Wynter Rogers	5 ft 11 in (1.8 m)	RS Fr	Little Rock Christian Academy	Little Rock, AR
G	3	Sarah Bates	5 ft 8 in (1.73 m)	GS	Clovis West; Georgia Tech	Fresno, CA
G	4	Danni Nichols	5 ft 10 in (1.78 m)	GS	David H. Hickman; Western Illinois	Columbia, MO
G	5	Imarianah Russell	5 ft 10 in (1.78 m)	Fr	Reynoldsburg	Columbus, OH
G	11	JJ Quinerly	5 ft 8 in (1.73 m)	So	Lake Taylor	Norfolk, VA
F	13	Messiah Hunter	6 ft 2 in (1.88 m)	RS Fr	TPLS Christian Academy	Hopewell, VA
F	14	Kylee Blacksten	6 ft 3 in (1.91 m)	Jr	Air Academy; Colorado	Colorado Springs, CO
F	21	Tavy Diggs	6 ft 1 in (1.85 m)	Sr	Plano East; TCU	Richardson, TX
F	23	Isis Beh	6 ft 3 in (1.91 m)	RS So	Murray; Salt Lake City CC	Murray, UT
G	24	Savannah Samuel	6 ft 1 in (1.85 m)	Jr	St. Francis HS; Oregon State	Woodstock, GA
G	30	Madisen Smith	5 ft 5 in (1.65 m)	GS	Greenville Senior	Greenville, SC
G	32	Kyah Watson	5 ft 10 in (1.78 m)	RS So	Stevens	Rapid City, SD

Head coach

- Dawn Plitzuweit (Michigan Tech)

Assistant coach(es)

- Jason Jeschke (Southwestern (KS))
- Aaron Horn (Toledo)
- Ariel Braker (Notre Dame)

Legend

- (C) Team captain
- (S) Suspended
- (I) Ineligible
- (W) Walk-on
- Injured
- Current redshirt

Roster

== Schedule and results ==
Date time, TV	Rank^{#}	Opponent^{#}	Result	Record	High points	High rebounds	High assists	Site (attendance) city, state
Exhibition
October 30, 2022*; 2:00 p.m., ESPN+		Fairmont State	W 83–49		14 – Hemingway	5 – Samuel	3 – Rogers	WVU Coliseum; Morgantown, WV
Non-conference regular season
November 10, 2022*; 7:00 p.m., ESPN+		USC Upstate	W 81–31	1–0	19 – Quinerly	7 – Watson	3 – Watson	WVU Coliseum (1,484); Morgantown, WV
November 17, 2022*; 10:00 a.m., ESPN+		Winthrop	W 70–48	2–0	15 – Smith	6 – Blacksten	3 – Tied	WVU Coliseum (6,640); Morgantown, WV
November 20, 2022*; 1:00 p.m., ESPN+		Appalachian State	W 72–51	3–0	18 – Blacksten	9 – Hemingway	8 – Smith	WVU Coliseum (1,611); Morgantown, WV
November 24, 2022*; 6:30 p.m., FloSports		vs. Central Michigan; Cancún Challenge	W 64–33	4–0	12 – Smith	8 – Diggs	6 – Watson	Hard Rock Hotel Riviera Maya (131); Cancún, Mexico
November 25, 2022*; 4:00 p.m., FloSports		vs. No. 13 NC State; Cancún Challenge	L 40–78	4–1	16 – Quinerly	7 – Watson	1 – Quinerly	Hard Rock Hotel Riviera Maya (107); Cancún, Mexico
November 30, 2022*; 7:00 p.m., ESPN+		North Carolina Central	W 89–58	5–1	20 – Smith	9 – Tied	4 – Tied	WVU Coliseum (1,094); Morgantown, WV
December 3, 2022*; 2:00 p.m., ESPN+		Delaware State	W 63–47	6–1	24 – Smith	9 – Tied	5 – Watso	WVU Coliseum (1,352); Morgantown, WV
December 8, 2022*; 7:00 p.m., ESPN+		Robert Morris	W 72–42	7–1	16 – Watson	11 – Hemingway	7 – Nichols	WVU Coliseum (1,685); Morgantown, WV
December 11, 2022*; 4:00 p.m., BTN+		at Penn State	L 57–69	7–2	16 – Quinerly	7 – Watson	4 – Smith	Bryce Jordan Center (2,218); University Park, PA
December 20, 2022*; 2:30 p.m.		vs. Georgia; West Palm Beach Invitational	W 49–45	8–2	13 – Nichols	10 – Diggs	3 – Nichols	Massimino Court (605); West Palm Beach, FL
December 21, 2022*; 12:00 p.m.		vs. Miami (OH); West Palm Beach Invitational	W 82–51	9–2	17 – Nichols	7 – Watson	5 – Quinerly	Massimino Court; West Palm Beach, FL
Big 12 regular season
December 31, 2022; 2:00 p.m., ESPN+		No. 20 Oklahoma	L 77–98	9–3 (0–1)	28 – Quinerly	10 – Blacksten	5 – Smith	WVU Coliseum (2,280); Morgantown, WV
January 4, 2023; 7:30 p.m., ESPN+		at No. 17 Iowa State	L 50–70	9–4 (0–2)	16 – Quinerly	7 – Watson	3 – Quinerly	Hilton Coliseum (9,044); Ames, IA
January 7, 2023; 2:00 p.m., ESPN+		at Kansas State	W 77–70	10–4 (1–2)	22 – Quinerly	9 – Blacksten	4 – Smith	Bramlage Coliseum (5,022); Manhattan, KS
January 10, 2023; 7:00 p.m., ESPN+		TCU	W 77–45	11–4 (2–2)	18 – Smith	8 – Hemingway	8 – Smith	WVU Coliseum (1,267); Morgantown, WV
January 15, 2023; 3:00 p.m., ESPNU		No. 18 Baylor	W 74–65	12–4 (3–2)	18 – Quinerly	14 – Hemingway	4 – Smith	WVU Coliseum (2,702); Morgantown, WV
January 18, 2023; 8:00 p.m., ESPN+		at Kansas	L 58–77	12–5 (3–3)	13 – Blacksten	6 – Tied	4 – Quinerly	Allen Fieldhouse (2,037); Lawrence, KS
January 21, 2023; 1:00 p.m., ESPN+		Texas Tech	W 67–57	13–5 (4–3)	18 – Hemingway	10 – Tied	6 – Smith	WVU Coliseum (2,710); Morgantown, WV
January 28, 2023; 2:00 p.m., ESPN+		at TCU	W 62–55	14–5 (5–3)	23 – Quinerly	7 – Tied	4 – Tied	Schollmaier Arena (2,314); Fort Worth, TX
February 1, 2023; 7:00 p.m., ESPN+		No. 24 Texas	L 56–69	14–6 (5–4)	12 – Bates	5 – Watson	1 – Tied	WVU Coliseum (1,651); Morgantown, WV
February 4, 2023; 3:00 p.m., ESPN+		at No. 20 Oklahoma	L 68–93	14–7 (5–5)	24 – Quinerly	5 – Tied	2 – Bates	Lloyd Noble Center (4,179); Norman, OK
February 7, 2023; 7:30 p.m., ESPN+		at Oklahoma State	L 68–93	14–8 (5–6)	18 – Quinerly	4 – Blacksten	5 – Smith	Gallagher-Iba Arena (2,036); Stillwater, OK
February 11, 2023; 6:00 p.m., ESPN+		No. 21 Iowa State	W 73–60	15–8 (6–6)	20 – Quinerly	12 – Tied	4 – Hemingway	WVU Coliseum (2,587); Morgantown, WV
February 15, 2023; 7:00 p.m., ESPN+		Kansas	W 62–60	16–8 (7–6)	17 – Smith	7 – Beh	7 – Smith	WVU Coliseum (1,557); Morgantown, WV
February 19, 2023; 4:00 p.m., ESPNU		at No. 17 Texas	L 48–74	16–9 (7–7)	16 – Quinerly	7 – Hemingway	2 – Tied	Moody Center (6,023); Austin, TX
February 22, 2023; 8:00 p.m., ESPN+		at Texas Tech	L 68–69 ^{2OT}	16–10 (7–8)	21 – Quinerly	12 – Watson	3 – Tied	United Supermarkets Arena (3,711); Lubbock, TX
February 25, 2023; 6:00 p.m., ESPN+		Kansas State	W 67–58	17–10 (8–8)	20 – Smith	6 – Smith	2 – Tied	WVU Coliseum (2,425); Morgantown, WV
March 1, 2023; 7:00 p.m., ESPN+		Oklahoma State	W 71–67	18–10 (9–8)	22 – Smith	6 – Quinery	4 – Watson	WVU Coliseum (1,952); Morgantown, WV
March 4, 2023; 6:00 p.m., ESPN+		at Baylor	W 63–52	19–10 (10–8)	30 – Smith	8 – Tied	7 – Smith	Ferrell Center (4,357); Waco, TX
Big 12 Tournament
March 10, 2023; 1:00 p.m., ESPNU	(5)	vs. (4) Oklahoma State; Quarterfinals	L 61–62	19–11	23 – Smith	6 – Tied	4 – Quinerly	Municipal Auditorium; Kansas City, MO
NCAA Tournament
March 17, 2023*; 12:00 p.m., ESPN	(10 G1)	vs. (7 G1) No. 25 Arizona; First Round	L 62–75	19–12	19 – Quinerly	8 – Tied	4 – Smith	Xfinity Center; College Park, MD
*Non-conference game. ^{#}Rankings from AP Poll. (#) Tournament seedings in parentheses. G1=Greenville 1. All times are in Central Time.

== Rankings ==
Ranking movements Legend: ██ Increase in ranking ██ Decrease in ranking — = Not ranked RV = Received votes
	Week																			
Poll	Pre	1	2	3	4	5	6	7	8	9	10	11	12	13	14	15	16	17	18	Final
AP	—	—	—	—	—	—	—	—	—	—	—	RV	—	—	—	—	—			
Coaches	—	—*	—	—	—	—	—	—	—	—	—	—	—	—	—	—	—			

The Coaches Poll did not release a Week 2 poll and the AP Poll did not release a poll after the NCAA Tournament.
