= 2022–23 Kansas Jayhawks women's basketball team =

American college basketball season

2022–23 Kansas Jayhawks women's basketball

WNIT champions
- Conference: Big 12 Conference
- Record: 25–11 (9–9 Big 12)
- Head coach: Brandon Schneider (8th season)
- Assistant coaches: Terry Nooner; Morgan Paige; Karyla Middlebrook
- Home arena: Allen Fieldhouse

2022–23 Big 12 Conference women's basketball standings
	Conf.				Overall
Team	W		L	PCT	W		L	PCT
No. 15 Texas	14	–	4	.778	26	–	10	.722
No. 16 Oklahoma	14	–	4	.778	26	–	7	.788
No. 17 Iowa State†	11	–	7	.611	22	–	10	.688
Oklahoma State	10	–	8	.556	21	–	12	.636
West Virginia	10	–	8	.556	19	–	12	.613
Baylor	10	–	8	.556	20	–	13	.606
Kansas	9	–	9	.500	22	–	11	.667
Texas Tech	6	–	12	.333	20	–	15	.571
Kansas State	5	–	13	.278	19	–	16	.543
TCU	1	–	17	.056	8	–	23	.258
† 2023 Big 12 Tournament winner As of March 24, 2023; Rankings from AP poll

The 2022–23 Kansas Jayhawks women's basketball team represented the University of Kansas in the 2022–23 NCAA Division I women's basketball season. The Jayhawks were led by eighth-year head coach Brandon Schneider. They played their home games at Allen Fieldhouse in Lawrence, Kansas as members of the Big 12 Conference. Kansas finished the season 25–11 and were not selected for the NCAA tournament. They were, however, selected for the Women's NIT, which they won for the first time in program history.

== Previous season ==
The Jayhawks finished the season 21–10, 11–7 in Big 12 play, to finish in a tie for fifth place. As the fifth seed in the Big 12 tournament, they lost to Oklahoma in the quarterfinals. They received an at-large bid to the 2022 NCAA tournament, which was their first since 2013, where they defeated Georgia Tech before losing in the second round to Stanford.

== Offseason ==
=== Departures ===
Kansas departures
Name	Num	Pos.	Height	Year	Hometown	Reason for departure
Erica Haynes-Overton	0	G	5'5"	Senior	Nashville, TN	Graduated
Matea Nikolic	3	F	6'4"	Freshman	Skopje, North Macedonia	Signed to play professional in Italy with Stella Azzurra Roma
Aniya Thomas	5	G	5'7"	Senior	Duncanville, TX	Graduate transferred to Missouri State
Julie Brosseau	20	G	5'9"	GS senior	Repentigny, QC	Graduated

=== Incoming ===
Kansas incoming transfers
Name	Num	Pos.	Height	Year	Hometown	Previous school
Wyvette Mayberry	0	G	5'7"	Junior	Tulsa, OK	Tulsa
Breeley Oakley	22			Junior		Howard College

==== Recruiting ====
There was no recruiting class of 2022.

== Roster ==
2022–23 Kansas Jayhawks women's basketball team
Players
Coaches

Pos.	#	Name	Height	Year	Hometown
G	0	Wyvette Mayberry	5 ft 7 in (1.7 m)	Jr	Tulsa, OK
C	1	Taiyanna Jackson	6 ft 6 in (1.98 m)	Sr	East Chicago, IN
G	4	Mia Vuksic	5 ft 10 in (1.78 m)	Jr	Šibenik, Croatia
F	10	Ioanna Chatzileonti	6 ft 2 in (1.88 m)	Jr	Athens, Greece
F	11	Sanna Strom	6 ft 0 in (1.83 m)	So	Luleå, Sweden
F	12	Katrine Jessen	6 ft 3 in (1.91 m)	Jr	Skovlunde, Denmark
G	13	Holly Kersgieter	5 ft 10 in (1.78 m)	Sr	Sand Springs, OK
C	14	Danai Papadopoulou	6 ft 4 in (1.93 m)	So	Thessaloniki, Greece
G	15	Zakiyah Franklin	5 ft 7 in (1.7 m)	Sr	Lakeland, FL
G	22	Breeley Oakley	5 ft 9 in (1.75 m)	Jr	Trophy Club, TX
F	23	Zsófia Telegdy	6 ft 3 in (1.91 m)	Fr	Budapest, Hungary
G	25	Chandler Prater	5 ft 11 in (1.8 m)	RS Jr	Kansas City, MO
C	33	Nadira Eltayeb	6 ft 4 in (1.93 m)	Jr	Tacoma, WA
C	45	Chisom Ajekwu	6 ft 4 in (1.93 m)	Sr	Lawrence, KS

Head coach

- Brandon Schneider (Wayland Baptist)

Assistant coach(es)

- Terry Nooner (Kansas)
- Morgan Paige (Wisconsin)
- Karyla Middlebrook (Kansas State)

Legend

- (C) Team captain
- (S) Suspended
- (I) Ineligible
- (W) Walk-on
- Injured
- Current redshirt

Roster
Last update: August 10, 2024

== Schedule and results ==
Date time, TV	Rank^{#}	Opponent^{#}	Result	Record	High points	High rebounds	High assists	Site (attendance) city, state
Non-conference
November 9, 2022*; 7:00 p.m., ESPN+		Jacksonville	W 72–61	1–0	17 – Kersgieter	12 – Jackson	4 – tied	Allen Fieldhouse (997); Lawrence, KS
November 16, 2022*; 7:00 p.m., ESPN+		UT Arlington	W 79–74	2–0	20 – Mayberry	13 – Jackson	3 – Prater	Allen Fieldhouse (1,832); Lawrence, KS
November 20, 2022*; 2:00 p.m., ESPN+		Texas–Rio Grande Valley	W 73–43	3–0	15 – tied	15 – Kersgieter	2 – tied	Allen Fieldhouse (2,359); Lawrence, KS
November 25, 2022*; 2:00 p.m., WCC Network		vs. Maine; Saint Mary's Thanksgiving Classic	W 76–49	4–0	21 – Franklin	9 – Jackson	3 – tied	University Credit Union Pavilion (112); Moraga, CA
November 26, 2022*; 4:00 p.m., WCC Network		at Saint Mary's; Saint Mary's Thanksgiving Classic	W 73–53	5–0	24 – Jackson	10 – Jackson	5 – Franklin	University Credit Union Pavilion (413); Moraga, CA
November 30, 2022*; 7:00 p.m., ESPN+		Texas A&M	W 74–42	6–0	23 – Kersgieter	11 – Jackson	3 – tied	Allen Fieldhouse (2,165); Lawrence, KS
December 4, 2022*; 2:00 p.m., ESPN+		Southeast Missouri State	W 88–51	7–0	17 – Jackson	7 – Chatzileonti	5 – Prater	Allen Fieldhouse (2,049); Lawrence, KS
December 8, 2022*; 7:30 p.m., P12N		at No. 12 Arizona	W 77–50	8–0	19 – tied	15 – Jackson	5 – Franklin	McKale Center (7,381); Tucson, AZ
December 11, 2022*; 2:00 p.m., ESPN+		Wichita State	W 72–52	9–0	16 – tied}	13 – Jackson	4 – Franklin	Allen Fieldhouse (2,556); Lawrence, KS
December 16, 2022*; 7:00 p.m., ESPN+	No. 22	Tulsa	W 81–62	10–0	26 – Franklin	12 – Chatzileonti	3 – tied	Allen Fieldhouse (3,292); Lawrence, KS
December 21, 2022*; 6:00 p.m., BTN+	No. 20	at Nebraska	L 79–85 ^{3OT}	10–1	26 – Franklin	12 – Chatzileonti	3 – tied	Pinnacle Bank Arena (4,637); Lincoln, NE
Conference
December 31, 2022; 4:00 p.m., ESPN+	No. 22	at Oklahoma State	W 80–65	11–1 (1–0)	23 – Kersgieter	19 – Jackson	5 – Mayberry	Gallagher-Iba Arena (2,973); Stillwater, OK
January 4, 2023; 7:00 p.m., ESPN+	No. 21	Texas Tech	W 77–59	12–1 (2–0)	26 – tied	18 – Jackson	5 – tied	Allen Fieldhouse (3,038); Lawrence, KS
January 7, 2023; 4:00 p.m., ESPN+	No. 21	No. 23 Baylor	L 62–75	12–2 (2–1)	19 – Mayberry	8 – Jackson	2 – tied	Allen Fieldhouse (3,528); Lawrence, KS
January 10, 2023; 7:00 p.m., LHN	No. 23	at Texas	L 59–72	12–3 (2–2)	20 – Kersgieter	12 – Jackson	5 – Mayberry	Moody Center (3,528); Austin, TX
January 14, 2023; 2:00 p.m., ESPN+	No. 23	at No. 19 Oklahoma	L 74–80	12–4 (2–3)	20 – Mayberry	13 – Jackson	1 – tied	Lloyd Noble Center (8,445); Norman, OK
January 18, 2023; 7:00 p.m., ESPN+		West Virginia	W 77–58	13–4 (3–3)	19 – tied	16 – Jackson	7 – Franklin	Allen Fieldhouse (2,037); Lawrence, KS
January 21, 2023; 5:00 p.m., ESPN+		at No. 18 Iowa State	L 50–64	13–5 (3–4)	13 – Jackson	15 – Jackson	4 – Franklin	Hilton Coliseum (10,677); Ames, IA
January 29, 2023; 5:00 p.m., ESPNU		Kansas State; Sunflower Showdown	W 75–62	14–5 (4–4)	26 – Mayberry	15 – Jackson	4 – Franklin	Allen Fieldhouse (3,282); Lawrence, KS
February 1, 2023; 7:00 p.m., ESPN+		at Baylor	L 73–77	14–6 (4–5)	20 – Kersgieter	9 – tied	4 – Prater	Ferrell Center (1,157); Waco, TX
February 4, 2023; 4:00 p.m., ESPN+		No. 24 Texas	L 65–68	14–7 (4–6)	21 – Jackson	13 – Jackson	8 – Mayberry	Allen Fieldhouse (3,301); Lawrence, KS
February 8, 2023; 7:00 p.m., ESPN+		TCU	W 73–55	15–7 (5–6)	19 – Prater	10 – Jackson	7 – Franklin	Allen Fieldhouse (2,264); Lawrence, KS
February 11, 2023; 2:00 p.m., ESPN+		at Texas Tech	W 78–67	16–7 (6–6)	24 – Jackson	11 – Jackson	6 – Prater	United Supermarkets Arena (4,217); Lubbock, TX
February 15, 2023; 6:00 p.m., ESPN+		at West Virginia	L 60–62	16–8 (6–7)	20 – Jackson	9 – tied	6 – Mayberry	WVU Coliseum (1,557); Morgantown, WV
February 19, 2023; 2:00 p.m., ESPN+		No. 15 Oklahoma	L 80–86	16–9 (6–8)	30 – Franklin	13 – Jackson	6 – tied	Allen Fieldhouse (3,729); Lawrence, KS
February 22, 2023; 6:30 p.m., ESPN+		at Kansas State; Sunflower Showdown	L 45–63	16–10 (6–9)	10 – Franklin	14 – Jackson	4 – Mayberry	Bramlage Coliseum (3,729); Manhattan, KS
February 26, 2023; 2:00 p.m., ESPN+		Oklahoma State	W 66–57	17–10 (7–9)	15 – tied	21 – Jackson	3 – Mayberry	Allen Fieldhouse (3,435); Lawrence, KS
March 1, 2023; 7:00 p.m., ESPN+		No. 23 Iowa State	W 98–93	18–10 (8–9)	31 – Franklin	8 – Jackson	6 – Mayberry	Allen Fieldhouse (3,053); Lawrence, KS
March 4, 2023; 1:00 p.m., ESPN+		at TCU	W 84–61	19–10 (9–9)	24 – Prater	9 – tied	5 – Prater	Schollmaier Arena (1,885); Fort Worth, TX
Big 12 tournament
March 9, 2023; 7:30 p.m., ESPN+	(7)	vs. (10) TCU; First round	L 52–57	19–11	21 – Prater	21 – Jackson	3 – Jackson	Municipal Auditorium (4,186); Kansas City, MO
WNIT
March 17, 2023*; 5:00 p.m., ESPN+		Western Kentucky; First round	W 86–72	20–11	21 – Prater	15 – Jackson	7 – Franklin	Allen Fieldhouse (2,518); Lawrence, KS
March 20, 2023*; 6:30 p.m., ESPN+		Missouri; Border War; Second round	W 75–47	21–11	21 – Franklin	8 – Jackson	7 – Mayberry	Allen Fieldhouse (3,682); Lawrence, KS
March 23, 2023*; 6:30 p.m., ESPN+		Nebraska; Super 16	W 64–55	22–11	16 – Jackson	16 – Prater	4 – Mayberry	Allen Fieldhouse (3,730); Lawrence, KS
March 26, 2023*; 2:00 p.m., ESPN+		Arkansas; Great 8	W 78–64	23–11	25 – Kersgieter	10 – Jackson	3 – tied	Allen Fieldhouse (4,806); Lawrence, KS
March 29, 2023*; 6:30 p.m., ESPN+		Washington; Fab 4	W 61–36	24–11	14 – Franklin	11 – Jackson	2 – Kersgieter	Allen Fieldhouse (7,229); Lawrence, KS
April 1, 2023*; 4:30 p.m., CBSSN		Columbia; Championship	W 66–59	25–11	19 – Franklin	21 – Jackson	4 – Franklin	Allen Fieldhouse (11,701); Lawrence, KS
*Non-conference game. ^{#}Rankings from AP poll / Coaches' Poll. (#) Tournament seedings in parentheses. All times are in Central.

== Rankings ==
Ranking movements Legend: ██ Increase in ranking ██ Decrease in ranking — = Not ranked RV = Received votes
	Week																				
Poll	Pre	1	2	3	4	5	6	7	8	9	10	11	12	13	14	15	16	17	18	19	Final
AP	RV	RV*	RV	RV	RV	RV	22	20	22	21	23	RV	—	—	—						Not released
Coaches	RV	RV	RV*	—	—	RV	24	24	25	25	25	RV	—	—	—						

*There was no week 2 coaches poll.
