= 2023 Big 12 Conference women's basketball tournament =

College basketball championship

- Classification: Division I
- Season: 2022–23
- Teams: 10
- Site: Municipal Auditorium; Kansas City, Missouri
- Champions: Iowa State (3rd title)
- Winning coach: Bill Fennelly (3rd title)
- MVP: Ashley Joens (Iowa State)
- Attendance: 25,385
- Television: ESPN+, ESPN2, ESPNU

2022–23 Big 12 Conference women's basketball standings
	Conf.				Overall
Team	W		L	PCT	W		L	PCT
No. 15 Texas	14	–	4	.778	26	–	10	.722
No. 16 Oklahoma	14	–	4	.778	26	–	7	.788
No. 17 Iowa State†	11	–	7	.611	22	–	10	.688
Oklahoma State	10	–	8	.556	21	–	12	.636
West Virginia	10	–	8	.556	19	–	12	.613
Baylor	10	–	8	.556	20	–	13	.606
Kansas	9	–	9	.500	22	–	11	.667
Texas Tech	6	–	12	.333	20	–	15	.571
Kansas State	5	–	13	.278	19	–	16	.543
TCU	1	–	17	.056	8	–	23	.258
† 2023 Big 12 Tournament winner As of March 24, 2023; Rankings from AP poll

The 2023 Phillips 66 Big 12 Conference women's basketball tournament is the postseason tournament for the Big 12 Conference that was held from March 9–12, 2023, in Kansas City, Missouri, at the Municipal Auditorium.

== Seeds ==
2023 Big 12 Conference women's basketball tournament seeds and results
Seed	School	Conf.	Over.
1	Texas‡#	14–4	23–8
2	Oklahoma#	14–4	24–5
3	Iowa State#	11–7	19–9
4	Oklahoma State#	10–8	20–10
5	West Virginia#	10–8	19–10
6	Baylor#	10–8	20–11
7	Kansas	9–9	19–10
8	Texas Tech	6–12	18–13
9	Kansas State	5–13	16–15
10	TCU	1–17	7–22
‡ – Big 12 Conference regular season champions, and tournament No. 1 seed. # - Received a single-bye in the conference tournament. Overall records do not include games played in the Big 12 Conference tournament.

== Schedule ==
Session	Game	Time	Matchup	Television	Attendance
First round – Thursday, March 9
1	1	5:00 pm	No. 9 Kansas State 79, No. 8 Texas Tech 69	ESPN+	4,186
1	2	7:30 pm	No. 10 TCU 57, No. 7 Kansas 52	ESPN+	4,186
Quarterfinals – Friday, March 10
2	3	11:00 am	No. 4 Oklahoma State 62 vs. No. 5 West Virginia 61	ESPNU	5,238
2	4	1:30 pm	No. 9 Kansas State 42 vs. No. 1 Texas 60	ESPNU	5,238
3	5	5:00 pm	No. 10 TCU 76 vs. No. 2 Oklahoma 77	ESPN+	4,979
3	6	7:30 pm	No. 6 Baylor 63 vs. No. 3 Iowa State 74	ESPN+	4,979
Semifinals – Saturday, March 11
4	7	Noon	No. 4 Oklahoma State 57 vs. No. 1 Texas 64	ESPN+	5,937
4	8	2:30 pm	No. 2 Oklahoma 72 vs. No. 3 Iowa State 82	ESPN+	5,937
Championship Game – Sunday, March 12
5	9	1:00 pm	No. 1 Texas 51 vs. No. 3 Iowa State 61	ESPN2	5,045
Game Times in CT. Rankings denote tournament seed.

== Bracket ==
First round Thursday, March 9 ESPN+
8	Texas Tech	69
9	Kansas State	79
7	Kansas	52
10	TCU	57

Quarterfinals; Friday, March 10; ESPNU/ESPN+
1	Texas	60
9	Kansas State	42
4	Oklahoma State	62
5	West Virginia	61
2	Oklahoma	77
10	TCU	76
3	Iowa State	74
6	Baylor	63

Semifinals; Saturday, March 11; ESPN+
1	Texas	64
4	Oklahoma State	57
2	Oklahoma	72
3	Iowa State	82

Championship game Sunday, March 12; ESPN2
1	Texas	51
3	Iowa State	61

*denotes overtime

== All-Tournament Team ==
Most Outstanding Player – Ashley Joens, Iowa State

Player	Team
Ashley Joens	Iowa State
Lexi Donarski	Iowa State
Rori Harmon	Texas
Shaylee Gonzales	Texas
Deyona Gaston	Texas
Skylar Vann	Oklahoma
