= Ashley Joens =

American basketball player (born 2000)

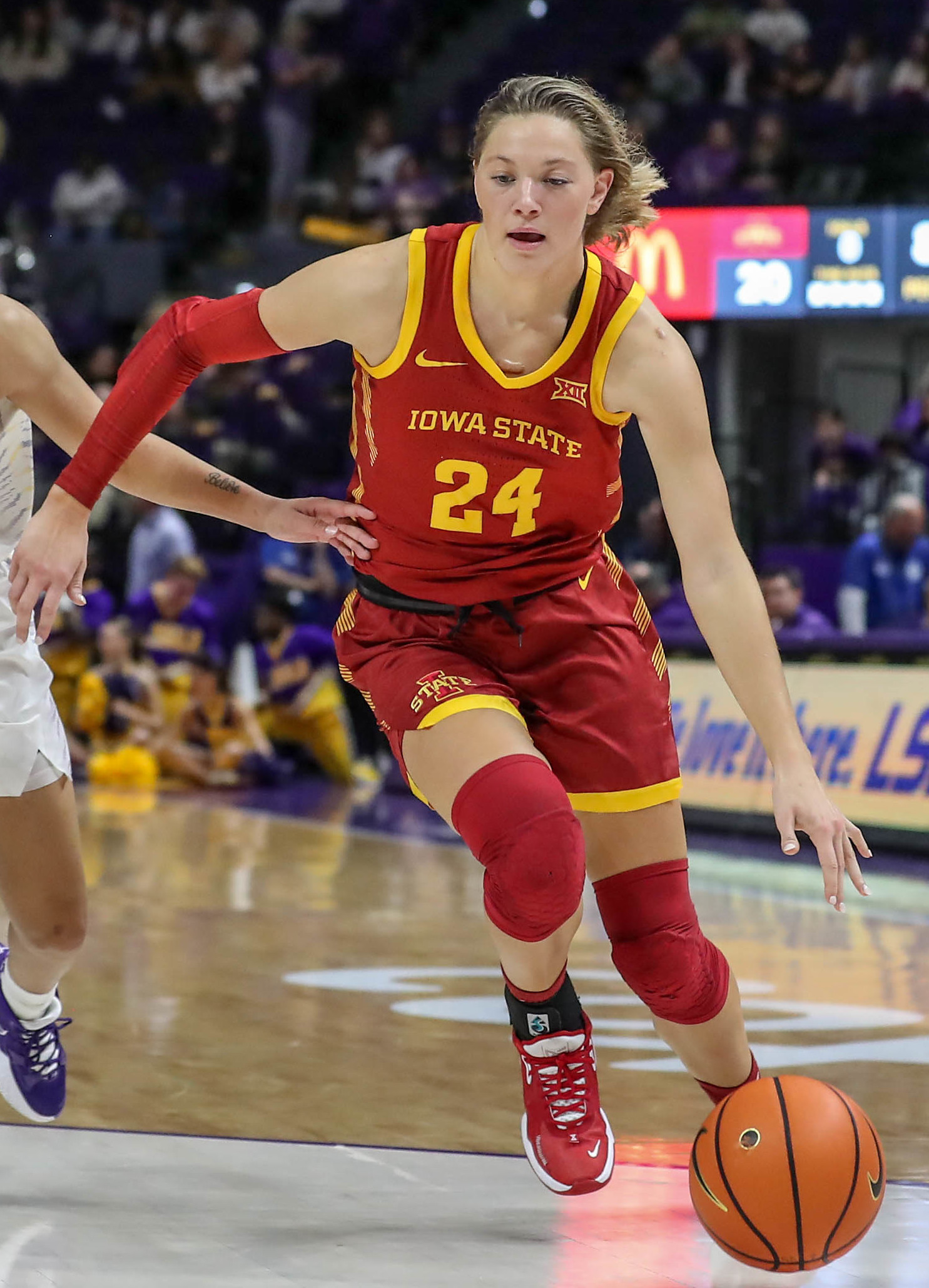
- Joens with Iowa State in 2021

No. 2 – Athinaikos B.C.
- Position: Small forward / shooting guard
- League: Greek Women's Basketball League

Personal information
- Born: March 16, 2000 (age 26) Cedar Rapids, Iowa, U.S.
- Listed height: 6 ft 1 in (1.85 m)
- Listed weight: 160 lb (73 kg)

Career information
- High school: Iowa City (Iowa City, Iowa)
- College: Iowa State (2018–2023)
- WNBA draft: 2023: 2nd round, 19th overall pick
- Drafted by: Dallas Wings
- Playing career: 2023–present

Career history
- 2023: Dallas Wings
- 2023: Las Vegas Aces
- 2023: Dallas Wings
- 2023: Phoenix Mercury
- 2023–2024: Dinamo Sassari
- 2024: Tauranga Whai
- 2025: Athinaikos
- 2025–2026: Flammes Carolo Basket

Career highlights
- TBA champion (2024); TBA All-Star Five (2024); Second-team All-American – USBWA (2023); Third-team All-American – AP (2023); Big 12 Tournament Most Outstanding Player (2023); Bob Bowlsby Award (2023); Big 12 Player of the Year (2023); 3× Cheryl Miller Award (2021–2023); 4× First-team All-Big 12 (2020–2023); Unanimous second-team All-American (2022); Third-team All-American – USBWA (2021); Big 12 All-Freshman Team (2019); Iowa Miss Basketball (2018)
- Stats at Basketball Reference
Medals
Women's basketball
Representing the United States
FIBA Under-19 World Cup
Gold medal – first place	2019 Thailand	Team
FIBA Americas Under-18 Championship
Gold medal – first place	2018 Mexico	Team

Ashley Rose Joens (/ˈdʒoʊnz/ Jones; born March 16, 2000) is an American professional basketball player who currently plays for the Athinaikos of the Greek Women's Basketball League. She played college basketball for the Iowa State Cyclones of the Big 12 Conference. She plays both the small forward and shooting guard positions. Joens had been considered one of the top prospects in the 2022 WNBA draft, but chose not to enter the draft and returned for a fifth season in 2022–23.

== High school career ==
Joens attended Iowa City High School, where she was a two-sport athlete in basketball and track and field. In basketball, she played on the varsity team all four years and started every single game, eventually becoming the school's all-time leader in points. As a high school senior, she averaged 30.7 points and 11.4 rebounds per game and was also named Miss Iowa Basketball at season's end.

A five-star recruit out of high school, Joens committed to playing college basketball at Iowa State, and was the program's highest rated recruit in history.

== College career ==
=== Freshman season ===
As a highly touted freshman, Joens appeared and started in all 35 games the Cyclones played that season, averaging nearly 12 points per game. She scored double figures in 20 games, and was named to the Big 12's All-Freshman team at the end of the season.

=== Sophomore season ===
In her sophomore season, Joens saw a more expanded role as she led the Big 12 Conference in points per game with 20.5, and also added 10.9 rebounds per game to average a double-double. She scored a career-high 41 points against Wright State on December 11, 2019, tied for second for a single-game scoring record by an Iowa State player.

=== Junior season ===
Joens continued to improve as she broke the Iowa State program's single-season record for points per game with 24.2, training in the barn of a family friend during the COVID-19 pandemic to stay in shape. She scored 36 points in a loss to South Dakota State, also earning her 19th double-double of the season.

In the opening round of the NCAA tournament, Joens scored 33 points to help lead the Cyclones past Michigan State 79–76. In their next match against Texas A&M, Joens recorded a double-double with 32 points and 18 rebounds in an overtime loss, becoming the 4th player from the Big 12 Conference to record 30+ points and 15+ rebounds in an NCAA tournament game.

In addition to being named to the first-team All-Big 12 Conference team, Joens gained national recognition at the end of the season as she was named the 2021 recipient of the Cheryl Miller Award, given to the best small forward in college basketball, as well as a third-team All-American by the United States Basketball Writers Association (USBWA).

=== Senior season ===
As a senior in 2021–22, Joens became the Cyclones' all-time scoring leader, averaging 20.3 points and 9.5 rebounds while the Cyclones reached the Sweet Sixteen of the NCAA tournament for the first time since 2010. She was a unanimous first-team All-Big 12 selection and repeated as the Cheryl Miller Award recipient. Joens was named to all three major All-America teams, making the Associated Press and USBWA second teams and the 10-member team chosen by the Women's Basketball Coaches Association.

=== "Super senior" season ===
Shortly after the Cyclones' 2022 NCAA tournament run ended, Joens announced that she would forego the WNBA draft and return for a fifth season at Iowa State. Because the 2020–21 basketball season had been extensively disrupted by COVID-19, the NCAA had ruled that said season would not be counted against the athletic eligibility of any basketball player, giving her the option of an extra college season. Joens was named to the six-member AP preseason All-America team (Note: The preseason All-America team normally has five members, but had six in 2022 due to a tie in voting for the fifth slot.) on October 25, 2022. She went on to lead the Big 12 in scoring and rank third in rebounding during the conference season, and was named the conference player of the year. During the Big 12 tournament, Joens became the 14th player in NCAA Division I women's history to score 3,000 career points, and was named the tournament's most outstanding player after leading the Cyclones to the title.

In December 2022, Joens completed her bachelor's degree in elementary education.

After the end of the 2022–23 academic year, Joens and TCU football star Max Duggan were announced as the inaugural recipients of the Big 12 Conference's Bob Bowlsby Award. The award, voted on by Big 12 athletic directors, honors on- and off-field leadership and excellence across all sports and is described by the Big 12 as "the Conference's most prestigious individual accolade".

== Professional career ==
=== WNBA (2023) ===
Joens was selected 19th overall in the second round of the 2023 WNBA draft by the Dallas Wings. She was waived by the Wings on June 23, 2023.

On July 20, Joens signed with the Las Vegas Aces on an emergency waiver contract. She appeared in two games for the Aces. On August 6, she returned to the Wings on a seven-day contract. On August 18, she signed with the Phoenix Mercury.

=== Dinamo Sassari (2023–2024) ===
Joens joined Dinamo Sassari of the Italian Serie A1 for the 2023–24 season.

=== Tauranga Whai (2024) ===
Joens joined the Tauranga Whai for the 2024 Tauihi Basketball Aotearoa season. She helped the Whai win the league championship. She was named Tauihi All-Star Five.

== WNBA career statistics ==
Legend
GP	Games played	GS	Games started	MPG	Minutes per game	RPG	Rebounds per game
APG	Assists per game	SPG	Steals per game	BPG	Blocks per game	PPG	Points per game
TO	Turnovers per game	FG%	Field-goal percentage	3P%	3-point field-goal percentage	FT%	Free-throw percentage
**Bold**	Career best	°	League leader

=== Regular season ===
Year	Team	GP	GS	MPG	FG%	3P%	FT%	RPG	APG	SPG	BPG	TO	PPG
2023	Las Vegas	2	0	3.0	.000	.000	—	0.0	0.0	0.0	0.0	**0.0**	0.0
2023	Dallas	**9**	0	1.6	.250	.000	.250	0.2	0.0	0.1	0.0	**0.0**	0.0
2023	Phoenix	8	0	**13.4**	**.387**	**.500**	**1.000**	**1.1**	**0.1**	**0.3**	0.0	0.6	**4.5**
Career	1 year, 3 teams	19	0	6.7	.361	.435	.500	0.6	0.1	0.2	0.0	0.3	2.1

== National team career ==
Joens was a member of the U-18 team for their appearance in the 2018 FIBA Under-18 Women's Americas Championship, winning a gold medal as the captain of the team despite not being named to the initial roster. She was also a member of the U-19 team that won the gold medal for the FIBA U19 Women's World Cup in Bangkok.

Joens was invited to participate in the Women's AmeriCup Team Trials in 2021.

== Career statistics ==
Legend
GP	Games played	GS	Games started	MPG	Minutes per game	RPG	Rebounds per game
APG	Assists per game	SPG	Steals per game	BPG	Blocks per game	PPG	Points per game
TO	Turnovers per game	FG%	Field-goal percentage	3P%	3-point field-goal percentage	FT%	Free-throw percentage
**Bold**	Career best	°	League leader

=== College ===
Year	Team	GP	GS	MPG	FG%	3P%	FT%	RPG	APG	SPG	BPG	TO	PPG
2018–19	Iowa State	**35**	**35**	31.2	.433	.365	.701	5.0	0.7	0.7	0.2	**1.1**	11.7
2019–20	Iowa State	29	29	35.6	.417	.336	.806	**10.9**	1.9	**1.6**	0.3	2.7	20.5°
2020–21	Iowa State	28	28	33.6	**.463**	.354	**.883**	9.5	1.6	1.0	**0.5**	2.5	**24.2**°
2021–22	Iowa State	34	34	35.5	.409	**.376**	.852	9.5	2.0	0.9	0.4	2.1	20.9
2022–23	Iowa State	32	32	**35.8**	.411	.353	.836	9.7	**2.0**	1.1	0.3	2.2	21.5°
**Career**		158	158	34.3	.425	.359	.831	8.8	1.6	1.0	0.4	2.1	19.4

== Personal life ==
Joens is the daughter of Brian and Lisa Joens, and has four sisters. Her older sister Courtney played basketball at Illinois while her younger sister Aubrey played basketball alongside her for two seasons at Iowa State before transferring to Oklahoma after the 2021–22 season.
