= Ann Meyers Drysdale Award =

American women's college basketball award

- Awarded for: The best women's college basketball shooting guard in the United States
- Country: United States
- Presented by: Naismith Memorial Basketball Hall of Fame & Women's Basketball Coaches Association (WBCA)
- First award: 2018
- Currently held by: Mikayla Blakes, Vanderbilt
- Website: Ann Meyers Drysdale Award

The Ann Meyers Drysdale Award is an award presented annually to the best women's basketball shooting guard in the National Collegiate Athletic Association (NCAA) Division I competition. It is named after Hall of Famer Ann Meyers Drysdale (née Meyers), the first high school player to make the United States national team and the first woman to receive a full athletic scholarship to UCLA.

== Creation and selection ==
The Ann Meyers Drysdale Award was first presented in 2018, when WBCA and the Naismith Hall, in collaboration with ESPN, incorporated the Nancy Lieberman Award, first presented in 2000 to the top Division I women's point guard, into a new set of awards known as the "Naismith Starting Five" that are presented at the WBCA convention (except in 2020, when the convention was not held due to the coronavirus pandemic) to players at each of the five traditional basketball positions. These awards parallel a previously existing set of men's basketball positional awards also presented by the Hall. In addition to the Lieberman Award, the other three new awards are:

- Katrina McClain Power Forward Award
- Cheryl Miller Small Forward Award
- Lisa Leslie Center Award

Winners for each of the Starting Five awards are determined by a selection committee consisting of Hall of Famers, WBCA coaching members, and media, and headed by the award's namesake. Fan voting through the Hall's website is also incorporated into the selection process.

== Key ==
*	Awarded, in addition, a national Player of the Year award: the Naismith College Player of the Year, Wade Trophy or the John R. Wooden Award
Player (X)	Denotes the number of times the player has received the Ann Meyers Drysdale Award

== Winners ==
Season	Player	School	Class	Ref.
2017–18	Victoria Vivians	Mississippi State	Senior	
2018–19	Asia Durr	Louisville	Senior	
2019–20	Aari McDonald	Arizona	Junior	
2020–21	Ashley Owusu	Maryland	Sophomore	
2021–22	Christyn Williams	UConn	Senior	
2022–23	Zia Cooke	South Carolina	Senior	
2023–24	JuJu Watkins	USC	Freshman	
2024–25	JuJu Watkins* (2)	USC	Sophomore	
2025–26	Mikayla Blakes	Vanderbilt	Sophomore	

== Winners by school ==
School	Winners	Years
USC	2	2024, 2025
Arizona	1	2020
Louisville	1	2019
Maryland	1	2021
Mississippi State	1	2018
South Carolina	1	2023
UConn	1	2022
Vanderbilt	1	2026

== See also ==
- Jerry West Award – the counterpart to the Meyers Drysdale Award; given to the best men's NCAA shooting guard
