= Nancy Lieberman Award =

American women's college basketball award

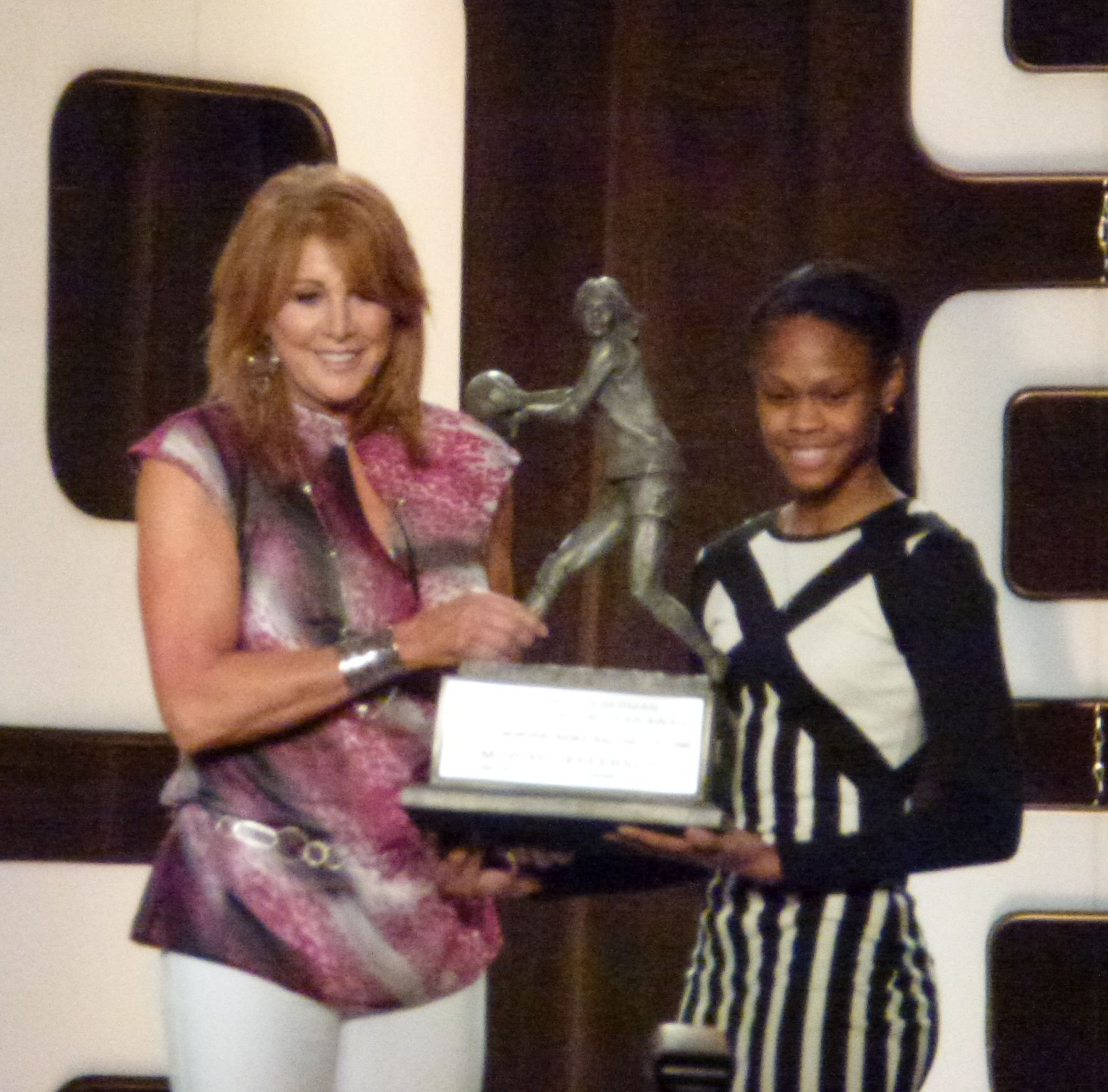
- Moriah Jefferson receiving the Nancy Lieberman Award
- Awarded for: The nation's top female point guard in NCAA Division I basketball
- Country: United States
- Presented by: Rotary Club of Detroit (2000–2013); Naismith Memorial Basketball Hall of Fame (2014–present); Women's Basketball Coaches Association (2018–present)
- First award: 2000
- Currently held by: Hannah Hidalgo, Notre Dame
- Website: Website

The Nancy Lieberman Award, named for Basketball Hall of Famer Nancy Lieberman is given to the nation's top collegiate point guard in women's Division I basketball. Sue Bird won the inaugural award in 2000, and later became the first of only three players to have won three Lieberman Awards. Paige Bueckers is the first freshman (first-year player) to win the award in 2021, and only three players have won as sophomores (second-year players)—Bird in 2000 and the other two three-time winners, Sabrina Ionescu in 2018 and Caitlin Clark in 2022.

The award is given to a player who exemplifies "the floor leadership, play-making and ball-handling skills that personified Nancy Lieberman during her career". Originally, voting was performed exclusively by sportswriters. The announcement of the winner has coincided with the Final Four weekend, with an award ceremony the following Wednesday which was hosted by the Detroit Rotary Club at the Detroit Athletic Club through 2013. The award was given annually by the Rotary Club of Detroit in the Award's first 14 years. Beginning with the 2014 award to Odyssey Sims of Baylor University, the Nancy Lieberman Award has been presented by the Naismith Memorial Basketball Hall of Fame as part of the Final Four proceedings, and is now presented at the annual convention of the Women's Basketball Coaches Association (WBCA).

The 2017–18 season started a new era for the award. Since that season, the WBCA has partnered with the Naismith Hall in the presentation of the award. The two bodies also incorporated the Lieberman Award into a new set of awards known as the "Naismith Starting Five", presented at the WBCA convention (except in 2020, when the convention was not held due to the COVID-19 pandemic) to players at each of the five traditional basketball positions. These awards parallel a previously existing set of men's basketball positional awards also presented by the Hall. The other four are:

- Ann Meyers Drysdale Shooting Guard Award
- Cheryl Miller Small Forward Award
- Katrina McClain Power Forward Award
- Lisa Leslie Center Award

The voting body for the Lieberman Award also changed upon its incorporation into the Naismith Starting Five. Each of the Starting Five awards is now determined by a selection committee consisting of Hall of Famers, WBCA coaching members, and media, and headed by the award's namesake. Fan voting through the Hall's website is also incorporated into the selection process.

UConn has produced the most Lieberman Award recipients, having had five players combine for a total of 10 awards (Bird, Diana Taurasi, Renee Montgomery, Moriah Jefferson, and Bueckers). The only other program with more than one recipient is Notre Dame, with two recipients (Skylar Diggins and Hannah Hidalgo) combining for three awards. The only other programs with more than one award are Iowa and Oregon, each of which had a single player win three awards, respectively Clark and Ionescu.

== Key ==
*	Awarded, in addition, a national Player of the Year award: the Naismith College Player of the Year, Wade Trophy or the John R. Wooden Award
Player (X)	Denotes the number of times the player has received the Nancy Lieberman Award

== Winners ==
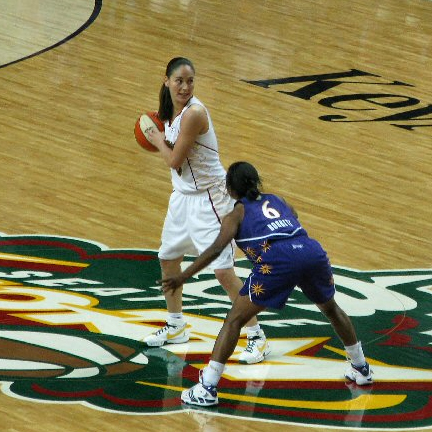
UConn's Sue Bird (with ball) is the first player to have won the Nancy Lieberman Award on three occasions.

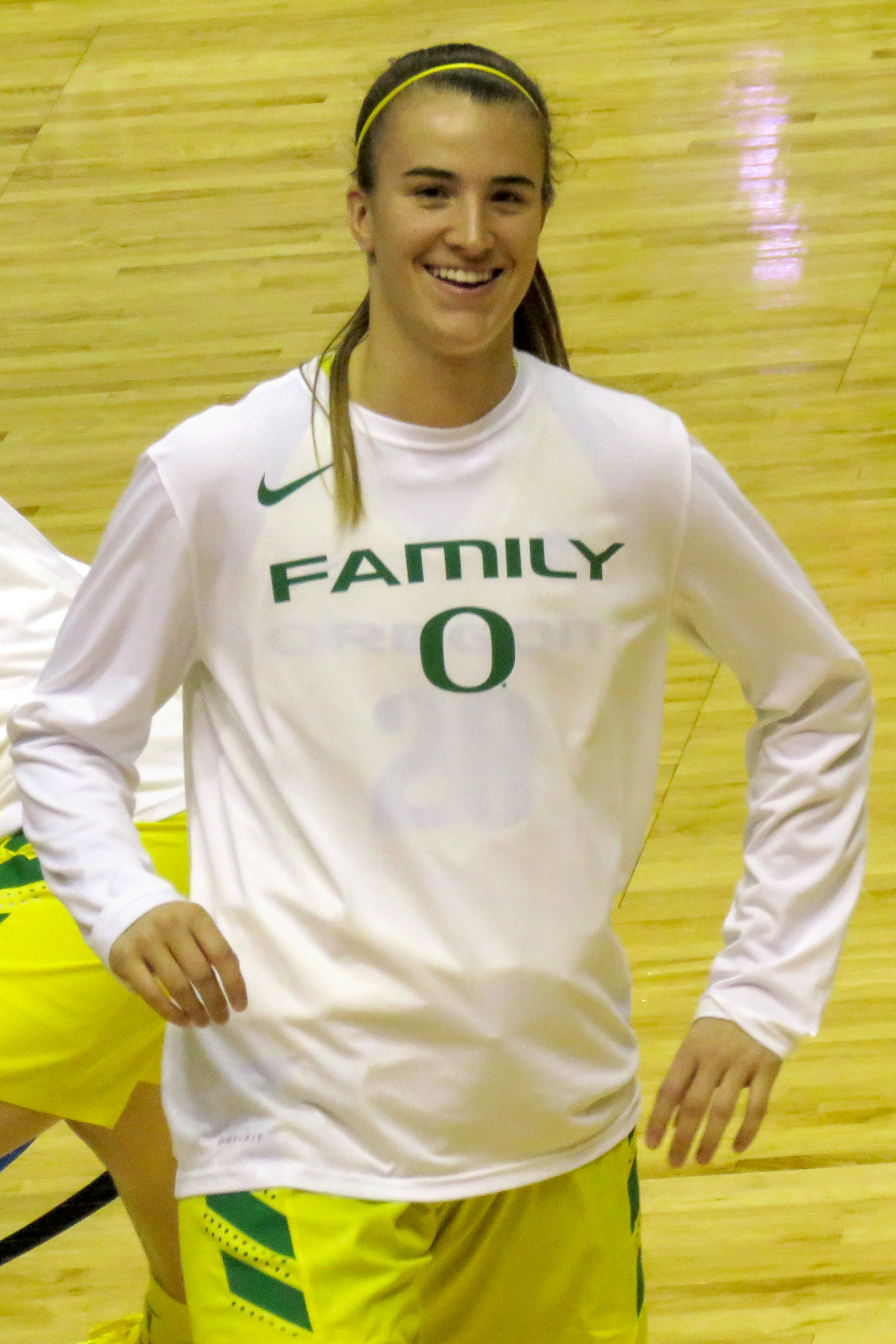
Sabrina Ionescu of Oregon is the second three-time winner of this award.

Season	Player	School	Class	Ref.
1999–2000	Sue Bird	UConn (Note: The University of Connecticut's official athletic brand name was "Connecticut" until 2013–14.)	Sophomore	
2000–01	Sue Bird (2)	UConn	Junior	
2001–02	Sue Bird* (3)	UConn	Senior	
2002–03	Diana Taurasi*	UConn	Junior	
2003–04	Diana Taurasi* (2)	UConn	Senior	
2004–05	Temeka Johnson	LSU	Senior	
2005–06	Ivory Latta	North Carolina	Junior	
2006–07	Lindsey Harding*	Duke	Senior	
2007–08	Kristi Toliver	Maryland	Junior	
2008–09	Renee Montgomery	UConn	Senior	
2009–10	Andrea Riley	Oklahoma State	Senior	
2010–11	Courtney Vandersloot	Gonzaga	Senior	
2011–12	Skylar Diggins	Notre Dame	Junior	
2012–13	Skylar Diggins (2)	Notre Dame	Senior	
2013–14	Odyssey Sims*	Baylor	Senior	
2014–15	Moriah Jefferson	UConn	Junior	
2015–16	Moriah Jefferson (2)	UConn	Senior	
2016–17	Kelsey Plum*	Washington	Senior	
2017–18	Sabrina Ionescu	Oregon	Sophomore	
2018–19	Sabrina Ionescu* (2)	Oregon	Junior	
2019–20	Sabrina Ionescu* (3)	Oregon	Senior	
2020–21	Paige Bueckers*	UConn	Freshman	
2021–22	Caitlin Clark	Iowa	Sophomore	
2022–23	Caitlin Clark* (2)	Iowa	Junior	
2023–24	Caitlin Clark* (3)	Iowa	Senior	
2024–25	Paige Bueckers* (2)	UConn	Senior (redshirt)	
2025–26	Hannah Hidalgo	Notre Dame	Junior	

== Winners by school ==
School	Awards	Individual recipients	Years
UConn	10	5	2000, 2001, 2002, 2003, 2004, 2009, 2015, 2016, 2021, 2025
Iowa	3	1	2022, 2023, 2024
Notre Dame	3	2	2012, 2013, 2026
Oregon	3	1	2018, 2019, 2020
Baylor	1	1	2014
Duke	1	1	2007
Gonzaga	1	1	2011
LSU	1	1	2005
Maryland	1	1	2008
North Carolina	1	1	2006
Oklahoma State	1	1	2010
Washington	1	1	2017

== See also ==
- Bob Cousy Award – the counterpart to the Lieberman Award; given to the best men's NCAA point guard
