= Cheryl Miller Award =

Award in US women's college basketball

- Awarded for: the best women's college basketball small forward in the United States
- Country: United States
- Presented by: Naismith Memorial Basketball Hall of Fame & Women's Basketball Coaches Association (WBCA)
- First award: 2018
- Currently held by: Madison Booker, Texas
- Website: Cheryl Miller Award

The Cheryl Miller Award is an award presented annually to the best women's basketball small forward in the National Collegiate Athletic Association (NCAA) Division I competition. It is named after Hall of Famer Cheryl Miller. While at Riverside (CA) Polytechnic High School, Miller set a single game scoring record of 105 points in a game in 1982. She was a four-time All-America, a three-time Naismith Player of the Year and a Wade Trophy winner while accumulating 3,018 career points at USC from 1982 to 1986. Miller is a 1984 Olympic gold medalist and was named the best college basketball player, both male and female, in 1986 by Sports Illustrated.

== Origin ==
The Cheryl Miller Award was first presented in 2018, when WBCA and the Naismith Hall, in collaboration with ESPN, incorporated the Nancy Lieberman Award, presented since 2000 to the top NCAA women's point guard, into a new set of awards known as the "Naismith Starting Five". All five awards are presented at the WBCA convention (except in 2020, when the convention was not held due to the COVID-19 pandemic) to players at each of the five traditional basketball positions. These awards parallel a previously existing set of men's basketball positional awards also presented by the Hall. In addition to the Lieberman Award, the other three new awards are:

- Ann Meyers Drysdale Shooting Guard Award
- Katrina McClain Power Forward Award
- Lisa Leslie Center Award

== Selection ==
Winner for each of the Starting Five awards is determined by a selection committee consisting of Hall of Famers, WBCA coaching members, and media, and headed by the award's namesake. Fan voting through the Hall's website is also incorporated into the selection process.

== Key ==
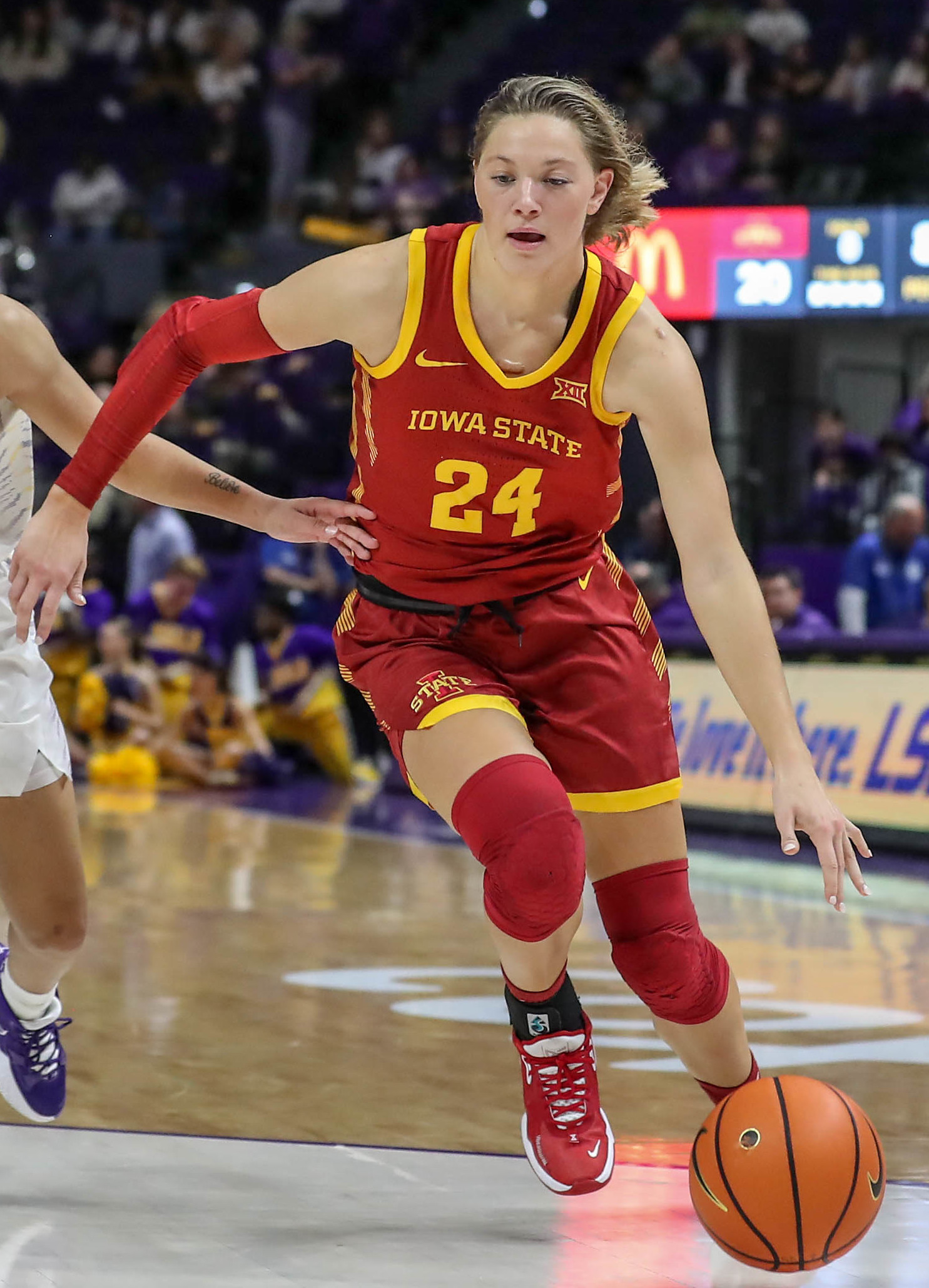
Ashley Joens of Iowa State is the first three-time winner (2021–2023)

*	Awarded, in addition, a national Player of the Year award: the Naismith College Player of the Year, Wade Trophy or the John R. Wooden Award
Player (X)	Denotes the number of times the player has received the Cheryl Miller Award

== Winners ==
Season	Player	School	Class	Ref.
2017–18	Gabby Williams	UConn	Senior	
2018–19	Bridget Carleton	Iowa State	Senior	
2019–20	Satou Sabally	Oregon	Junior	
2020–21	Ashley Joens	Iowa State	Junior	
2021–22	Ashley Joens (2)	Iowa State	Senior	
2022–23	Ashley Joens (3)	Iowa State	Graduate	
2023–24	Madison Booker	Texas	Freshman	
2024–25	Madison Booker (2)	Texas	Sophomore	
2025–26	Madison Booker (3)	Texas	Junior	

== Winners by school ==
School	Awards	Individual recipients	Years
Iowa State	4	2	2019, 2021, 2022, 2023
Texas	3	1	2024, 2025, 2026
Oregon	1	1	2020
UConn	1	1	2018

== See also ==
- Julius Erving Award – the counterpart to the Miller Award; given to the best men's NCAA small forward
