= Lisa Leslie Award =

Women's basketball award in NCAA

- Awarded for: The best women's college basketball center in the United States
- Country: United States
- Presented by: Naismith Memorial Basketball Hall of Fame & Women's Basketball Coaches Association (WBCA)
- First award: 2018
- Currently held by: Lauren Betts, UCLA
- Website: Lisa Leslie Award

The Lisa Leslie Award is an award presented annually to the best women's basketball center in the National Collegiate Athletic Association (NCAA) Division I competition. It is named after Hall of Famer Lisa Leslie, an eight-time All Star and two-time champion of the WNBA in her 12 years career with the LA Sparks. In 2002, Leslie became the first player to dunk in a WNBA game, en route to a second championship for the Sparks. Leslie retired as the WNBA all-time leading scorer & rebounder and is a four-time Olympic gold medalist.

The Lisa Leslie Award was first presented in 2018, when WBCA and the Naismith Hall, in collaboration with ESPN, incorporated the previously existing Nancy Lieberman Award, presented to the top NCAA women's point guard, into a new set of awards known as the "Naismith Starting Five", that are presented at the WBCA convention (except in 2020, when the convention was not held due to the coronavirus pandemic) to players at each of the five traditional basketball positions. These awards parallel a previously existing set of men's basketball positional awards also presented by the Hall. In addition to the Lieberman Award, first presented in 2000, the other three new awards are:

- Ann Meyers Drysdale Shooting Guard Award
- Katrina McClain Power Forward Award
- Cheryl Miller Small Forward Award

Winner for each of the Starting Five awards is determined by a selection committee consisting of Hall of Famers, WBCA coaching members, and media, and headed by the award's namesake. Fan voting through the Hall's website is also incorporated into the selection process.

== Key ==
*	Awarded, in addition, a national Player of the Year award: the Naismith College Player of the Year, Wade Trophy or the John R. Wooden Award
Player (X)	Denotes the number of times the player has received the Lisa Leslie Award

== Winners ==
Season	Player	School	Class	Ref.
2017–18	A'ja Wilson*	South Carolina	Senior	
2018–19	Megan Gustafson*	Iowa	Senior	
2019–20	Aliyah Boston	South Carolina	Freshman	
2020–21	Aliyah Boston (2)	South Carolina	Sophomore	
2021–22	Aliyah Boston* (3)	South Carolina	Junior	
2022–23	Aliyah Boston (4)	South Carolina	Senior	
2023–24	Cameron Brink	Stanford	Senior	
2024–25	Lauren Betts	UCLA	Junior	
2025–26	Lauren Betts (2)	UCLA	Senior	

== Winners by school ==
School	Awards	Individual recipients	Years
South Carolina	5	2	2018, 2020, 2021, 2022, 2023
UCLA	2	1	2025, 2026
Iowa	1	1	2019
Stanford	1	1	2024

== See also ==
- Kareem Abdul-Jabbar Award – the counterpart to the Leslie Award; given to the best men's NCAA center
