= Katrina McClain Award =

American women's college basketball award

- Awarded for: The best women's college basketball power forward in the United States
- Country: United States
- Presented by: Naismith Memorial Basketball Hall of Fame & Women's Basketball Coaches Association (WBCA)
- First award: 2018
- Currently held by: Sarah Strong, UConn
- Website: Katrina McClain Award

The Katrina McClain Award is an award presented annually to the best women's basketball power forward in the National Collegiate Athletic Association (NCAA) Division I competition. It is named after Hall of Famer Katrina McClain-Pittman, a two-time USA Basketball Female Athlete of the Year with two Olympic gold, one Olympic bronze, and three FIBA World Championships medals. McClain was the WBCA National Player of the Year in her senior season at Georgia.

The Katrina McClain Award was first presented in 2018, when WBCA and the Naismith Hall, in collaboration with ESPN, incorporated the Nancy Lieberman Award, presented since 2000 to the top NCAA women's point guard, into a new set of awards known as the "Naismith Starting Five". All five awards are presented at the WBCA convention (except in 2020, when the convention was not held due to the COVID-19 pandemic) to players at each of the five traditional basketball positions. These awards parallel a previously existing set of men's basketball positional awards also presented by the Hall. In addition to the Lieberman Award, the other three new awards are:

- Ann Meyers Drysdale Shooting Guard Award
- Cheryl Miller Small Forward Award
- Lisa Leslie Center Award

The winner for each of the Starting Five awards is determined by a selection committee consisting of Hall of Famers, WBCA coaching members, and media, and headed by the award's namesake. Fan voting through the Hall's website is also incorporated into the selection process.

== Key ==
*	Awarded, in addition, a national Player of the Year award: the Naismith College Player of the Year, Wade Trophy or the John R. Wooden Award
Player (X)	Denotes the number of times the player has received the Katrina McClain Award

== Winners ==
Season	Player	School	Class	Ref.
2017–18	Ruthy Hebard	Oregon	Sophomore	
2018–19	Napheesa Collier	UConn	Senior	
2019–20	Ruthy Hebard (2)	Oregon	Senior	
2020–21	NaLyssa Smith*	Baylor	Junior	
2021–22	NaLyssa Smith (2)	Baylor	Senior	
2022–23	Maddy Siegrist	Villanova	Senior	
2023–24	Kiki Iriafen	Stanford	Junior	
2024–25	Aneesah Morrow	LSU	Senior	
2025–26	Sarah Strong*	UConn	Sophomore	

== Winners by school ==
School	Winners	Years
Baylor	2	2021, 2022
Oregon	2	2018, 2020
UConn	2	2019, 2026
Villanova	1	2023
Stanford	1	2024
LSU	1	2025

== See also ==
- Karl Malone Award – the counterpart to the McClain Award; given to the best men's NCAA power forward
