= 2022–23 Oklahoma State Cowgirls basketball team =

Women's college basketball season

2022–23 Oklahoma State Cowgirls basketball

NCAA tournament, first round
- Conference: Big 12 Conference
- Record: 21–12 (10–8 Big 12)
- Head coach: Jacie Hoyt (1st season)
- Assistant coaches: Jhasmin Player; Jack Easley; Tealor Karr
- Home arena: Gallagher-Iba Arena

2022–23 Big 12 Conference women's basketball standings
	Conf.				Overall
Team	W		L	PCT	W		L	PCT
No. 15 Texas	14	–	4	.778	26	–	10	.722
No. 16 Oklahoma	14	–	4	.778	26	–	7	.788
No. 17 Iowa State†	11	–	7	.611	22	–	10	.688
Oklahoma State	10	–	8	.556	21	–	12	.636
West Virginia	10	–	8	.556	19	–	12	.613
Baylor	10	–	8	.556	20	–	13	.606
Kansas	9	–	9	.500	22	–	11	.667
Texas Tech	6	–	12	.333	20	–	15	.571
Kansas State	5	–	13	.278	19	–	16	.543
TCU	1	–	17	.056	8	–	23	.258
† 2023 Big 12 Tournament winner As of March 24, 2023; Rankings from AP poll

The 2022–23 Oklahoma State Cowgirls basketball team represented Oklahoma State University in the 2022–23 NCAA Division I women's basketball season. The Cowgirls, led by first year head coach Jacie Hoyt, played their home games at Gallagher-Iba Arena and were members of the Big 12 Conference.

== Previous season ==
The Cowgirls finished the season 9–20 overall and 3–15 in the Big 12 conference. In the Big 12 Tournament Oklahoma State was a nine seed and beat eighth seed Texas Tech 73–58 but would lose to number one seed Baylor 76–36.

At the end of the regular season, Oklahoma State and head coach Jim Littell mutually agreed to part ways but continued to coach through the Big 12 Tournament.

On March 20, Jacie Hoyt was introduced as the new head coach.

== Offseason ==
=== Departures ===
Name	Number	Pos.	Height	Year	Hometown	Reason for departure
Tracey Bershers	0	F	6'2"	R-Freshman	Fort Smith, AR	Transferred to UAB
Neferatali Notoa	2	G	5'11"	Sophomore	Brisbane, Australia	Left team
Micah Dennis	3	G	5'9"	Junior	Toronto, Canada	Transferred to East Carolina
Chloe Mayer	5	G	5'5"	Junior	Chico, CA	Transfer Portal
N'Yah Boyd	11	G	5'6"	Junior	Mesquite, TX	Transferred to UTEP
Ruthie Udoumoh	22	F	6'0"	Sophomore	Broken Arrow, OK	Transferred to Oral Roberts
Lauren Fields	23	G	5'9"	Junior	Shawnee, OK	Transferred to Arizona
Kennedi Jackson	24	F	6'3"	Sophomore	New Orleans, LA	Transferred to Charleston Southern
Abbie Winchester	25	G	6'1"	Graduate Student	Oklahoma City, OK	Graduated
Sara Rodrigues	30	G	6'3"	Junior	São Paulo, Brazil	Transferred to Oral Roberts
Tori Garza	32	F	6'1"	Freshman	New Caney, TX	Transferred to Tulane
Brittany Reeves	35	F	6'5"	Senior	Macon, GA	Transferred to Mercer

=== Incoming transfers ===
Name	Number	Pos.	Height	Year	Hometown	Previous School
Naomie Alnatas	3	G	5'7"	RS-5th Year	Cayenne, French Guiana	Kansas City
Terryn Milton	21	G	5'9"	5th Year	Owasso, OK	UT Arlington
Lior Garzon	11	F	6'1"	Junior	Ra'anana, Israel	Villanova
Anna Gret Asi	4	G	5'8"	Sophomore	Tartu, Estonia	Arizona
Makyra Tramble	34	F	5'10"	Senior	Shawnee, OK	Southwestern Oklahoma State
Claire Chastain	12	G	6'0"	5th Year	Shawnee, OK	UT Arlington
Trinitee Jackson	23	F	6'3"	5th Year	Dallas, TX	Arkansas State
Landry Williams	30	G	5'9"	Sophomore	Tulsa, OK	Kansas City

== Roster ==
2022–23 Oklahoma State Cowgirls women's basketball team
Players
Coaches

Pos.	#	Name	Height	Year	Previous school	Hometown
C	1	Kassidy De Lapp	6 ft 3 in (1.91 m)	GS	Oak Ridge High School	El Dorado Hills, CA
G	3	Naomie Alnatas	5 ft 7 in (1.7 m)	GS	Chalon Basket; Iowa Western Community College; Kansas City	Cayenne, French Guiana
G	4	Anna Gret Asi	5 ft 8 in (1.73 m)	So	Tartu University; Arizona	Tartu, Estonia
F	11	Lior Garzon	6 ft 1 in (1.85 m)	Jr	Hof HaSharon; Villanova	Ra'anana, Israel
G	12	Claire Chastain	6 ft 0 in (1.83 m)	GS	Dale High School; UT Arlington	Shawnee, OK
F	14	Taylen Collins	6 ft 1 in (1.85 m)	Jr	Muldrow High School	Muldrow, OK
G	15	Lexy Keys	5 ft 7 in (1.7 m)	Jr	Tahlequah-Sequoyah High School	Tahlequah, OK
G	20	Macie James	5 ft 11 in (1.8 m)	So	San Joaquin High School	Fresno, CA
G	21	Terryn Milton	5 ft 9 in (1.75 m)	GS	Owasso High School; UT Arlington	Owasso, OK
F	23	Trinitee Jackson	6 ft 3 in (1.91 m)	GS	Christian County High School; Arkansas State	Dallas, TX
F	24	Praise Egharevba	6 ft 3 in (1.91 m)	Fr	Nottingham Academy	Papenburg, Germany
G	30	Landry Williams	5 ft 9 in (1.75 m)	So	Metro Christian Academy	Tulsa, OK
F	34	Makyra Tramble	5 ft 10 in (1.78 m)	Sr	Shawnee High School; Southwestern Oklahoma State	Shawnee, OK

Head coach

- Jacie Hoyt (Wichita State)

Assistant coach(es)

- Jhasmin Player (Baylor)
- Jack Easley (Missouri Valley)
- Taelor Karr (Kansas State)

Legend

- (C) Team captain
- (S) Suspended
- (I) Ineligible
- (W) Walk-on
- Injured
- Current redshirt

Roster
Last update: November 5, 2022

== Schedule and results ==
Date time, TV	Rank^{#}	Opponent^{#}	Result	Record	High points	High rebounds	High assists	Site (attendance) city, state
Exhibition
November 1, 2022*; 6:30 pm		Northeastern State	W 91–41	–	16 – De Lapp	9 – Tied	–	Gallagher-Iba Arena (1,547); Stillwater, OK
Non-conference regular season
November 7, 2022*; 5:00 pm		UT Rio Grande Valley	W 95–63	1–0	19 – Garzon	12 – Collins	7 – Alnatas	Gallagher–Iba Arena (1,517); Stillwater, OK
November 11, 2022*; 6:30 pm		Northwestern State	W 89–51	2–0	14 – Garzon	8 – Collins	6 – Asi	Gallagher–Iba Arena (1,657); Stillwater, OK
November 14, 2022*; 6:30 pm, ESPN+		Oral Roberts	W 103–66	3–0	24 – Chastain	8 – Collins	6 – Milton	Gallagher–Iba Arena (1,578); Stillwater, OK
November 17, 2022*; 6:00 pm, ESPN+		at Missouri State	W 73–54	4–0	28 – Alnatas	6 – Tied	4 – Chastain	Great Southern Bank Arena (2,002); Springfield, MO
November 20, 2022*; 1:00 pm, ESPN+		Kent State	L 56–59	4–1	19 – Chastain	9 – Milton	4 – Alnatas	Gallagher–Iba Arena (1,644); Stillwater, OK
November 24, 2022*; 10:00 am, FlooHoops		vs. Florida State; Cancún Challenge	W 79–77	5–1	19 – Alnatas	17 – Collins	4 – Tied	Hard Rock Hotel Riviera Maya (107); Riviera Maya, Mexico
November 25, 2022*; 10:00 am, FloHoops		vs. Harvard; Cancún Challenge	W 71–62	6–1	20 – Chastain	7 – Chastain	4 – Milton	Hard Rock Hotel Riviera Maya (113); Riviera Maya, Mexico
November 26, 2022*; 12:30 pm, FloHoops		vs. Purdue; Cancún Challenge	L 65–71	6–2	23 – Alnatas	8 – Collins	4 – Milton	Hard Rock Hotel Riviera Maya (136); Riviera Maya, Mexico
December 3, 2022*; 4:00 pm, ESPN+		North Texas	W 82–64	7–2	21 – Garzon	23 – Collins	6 – Milton	Gallagher–Iba Arena (1,589); Stillwater, OK
December 6, 2022*; 11:00 am, ESPN+		Loyola Marymount	W 86–56	8–2	20 – Garzon	6 – Chastain	5 – Tied	Gallagher–Iba Arena (3,036); Stillwater, OK
December 18, 2022*; 3:00 pm, ESPN+		UNLV	W 87–62	9–2	20 – Garzon	6 – Tied	6 – Alnatas	Gallagher–Iba Arena (2,682); Stillwater, OK
December 20, 2022*; 11:00 am, ESPN+		Air Force	W 62–44	10–2	14 – Chastain	15 – Collins	9 – Alnatas	Gallagher–Iba Arena (2,117); Stillwater, OK
Big 12 regular season
December 31, 2022; 4:00 pm, ESPN+		No. 22 Kansas	L 65–80	10–3 (0–1)	17 – Garzon	7 – Chastain	5 – Milton	Gallagher–Iba Arena (2,973); Stillwater, OK
January 4, 2023; 6:30 pm, ESPN+		at Kansas State	L 72–86	10–4 (0–2)	19 – Alnatas	7 – Tied	6 – Alnatas	Bramlage Coliseum (2,602); Manhattan, KS
January 7, 2023; 6:00 pm, ESPN+		Texas	W 86–82	11–4 (1–2)	20 – Alnatas	8 – Collins	8 – Alnatas	Gallagher–Iba Arena (2,228); Stillwater, OK
January 11, 2023; 7:00 pm, ESPN+		at No. 18 Baylor	W 70–65	12–4 (2–2)	18 – Garzon	9 – Tied	3 – Tied	Ferrell Center (3,972); Waco, TX
January 14, 2023; 2:00 pm, ESPN+		TCU	W 80–70	13–4 (3–2)	24 – Alnatas	14 – Collins	5 – Milton	Gallagher–Iba Arena (2,540); Stillwater, OK
January 18, 2023; 6:30 pm, ESPN+		at No. 18 Iowa State	L 64–69	13–5 (3–3)	15 – Asi	10 – Collins	4 – Alnatas	Hilton Coliseum (9,879); Ames, IA
January 21, 2023; 6:00 pm, ESPN+		at No. 15 Oklahoma; Bedlam Series	L 93–97	13–6 (3–4)	26 – Asi	6 – Tied	4 – Milton	Lloyd Noble Center (9,580); Norman, OK
January 25, 2023; 6:30 pm, ESPN+		Kansas State	W 82–74	14–6 (4–4)	17 – Tied	8 – Collins	7 – Tied	Gallagher–Iba Arena (2,081); Stillwater, OK
January 28, 2023; 7:00 pm, LHN		at Texas	L 69–78	14–7 (4–5)	21 – Garzon	10 – Collins	6 – Alnatas	Moody Center (6,123); Austin, TX
February 1, 2023; 6:30 pm, ESPN+		Texas Tech	W 86–74	15–7 (5–5)	22 – Milton	6 – Milton	9 – Milton	Gallagher–Iba Arena (1,901); Stillwater, OK
February 4, 2023; 1:00 pm, ESPN+		at TCU	W 77–65	16–7 (6–5)	20 – Alnatas	8 – Tied	5 – Tied	Schollmaier Arena (2,458); Fort Worth, TX
February 7, 2023; 6:30 pm, ESPN+		West Virginia	W 76–65	17–7 (7–5)	16 – Alnatas	13 – Collins	5 – Milton	Gallagher–Iba Arena (2,036); Stillwater, OK
February 11, 2023; 2:00 pm, ESPN+		Baylor	W 77–56	18–7 (8–5)	15 – Asi	13 – Collins	4 – Milton	Gallagher–Iba Arena (3,799); Stillwater, OK
February 18, 2023; 2:00 pm, ESPN+		at Texas Tech	W 92–80 ^{3OT}	19–7 (9–5)	28 – Alnatas	7 – Collins	4 – Keys	United Supermarkets Arena (6,070); Lubbock, TX
February 22, 2023; 6:30 pm, ESPN+		No. 20 Iowa State	W 73–68	20–7 (10–5)	15 – Milton	6 – Tied	4 – Tied	Gallagher–Iba Arena (2,768); Stillwater, OK
February 26, 2023; 2:00 pm, ESPN+		at Kansas	L 57–66	20–8 (10–6)	12 – Alnatas	12 – Collins	4 – Keys	Allen Fieldhouse (3,435); Lawrence, KS
March 1, 2023; 6:00 pm, ESPN+		at West Virginia	L 67–71	20–9 (10–7)	13 – Keys	8 – Collins	5 – Milton	WVU Coliseum (1,592); Morgantown, WV
March 4, 2023; 2:00 pm, ESPN+		No. 16 Oklahoma; Bedlam Series	L 71–80	20–10 (10–8)	15 – Alnatas	6 – Milton	3 – Alnatas	Gallagher–Iba Arena (6,585); Stillwater, OK
Big 12 Women's Tournament
March 10, 2023; 11:00 am, ESPNU	(4)	vs. (5) West Virginia; Quarterfinals	W 62–61	21–10	16 – Alnatas	15 – Collins	6 – Alnatas	Municipal Auditorium; Kansas City, MO
March 11, 2023; 12:00 pm, ESPN+	(4)	vs. (1) No. 15 Texas; Semifinals	L 57–64	21–11	13 – Alnatas	8 – De Lapp	4 – Milton	Municipal Auditorium; Kansas City, MO
NCAA Women's Tournament
March 18, 2023*; 1:00 pm, ESPN	(8 G2)	vs. (9 G2) Miami (FL); First Round	L 61–62	21–12	16 – Asi	16 – Collins	4 – Milton	Simon Skjodt Assembly Hall (13,607); Bloomington, IN
*Non-conference game. ^{#}Rankings from AP Poll. (#) Tournament seedings in parentheses. G2=Greenville 2. All times are in Central Time.
