= 2022–23 Incarnate Word Cardinals women's basketball team =

Intercollegiate basketball season

2022–23 Incarnate Word Cardinals women's basketball
- Conference: Southland Conference
- Record: 15–14 (10–8 Southland)
- Head coach: Jeff Dow (4th season)
- Assistant coaches: Amber Cunningham; Beverly Holmes; Rachel Baity
- Home arena: McDermott Center (Capacity: 2,000)

2022–23 Southland Conference women's basketball standings
	Conf.				Overall
Team	W		L	PCT	W		L	PCT
Southeastern Louisiana †	14	–	4	.778	21	–	10	.677
Texas A&M–Corpus Christi	14	–	4	.778	19	–	12	.613
Lamar	12	–	6	.667	20	–	12	.625
Incarnate Word	10	–	8	.556	15	–	14	.517
Texas A&M–Commerce*	10	–	8	.556	14	–	19	.424
McNeese	8	–	10	.444	12	–	19	.387
New Orleans	7	–	11	.389	8	–	20	.286
Northwestern State	7	–	11	.389	11	–	18	.379
Houston Christian	6	–	12	.333	11	–	18	.379
Nicholls	2	–	16	.111	5	–	24	.172
† 2023 Southland tournament winner * ineligible for the 2023 NCAA tournament due to transition period As of March 18, 2023

The 2022–23 Incarnate Word Cardinals women's basketball team represented the University of the Incarnate Word in the 2022–23 NCAA Division I women's basketball season. The Cardinals were led by coach Jeff Dow, in his fourth season, and were members of the Southland Conference.

== Previous season ==
The Cardinals finished the 2021–22 season with a 14–17 record overall and a 5–9 record in Southland Conference play, tied for fifth place with Northwestern State in the conference regular season. Winning the regular season head-to-head with Northwestern State, the Cardinals entered the 2022 Southland Conference women's basketball tournament as the No. 5 seed. They won the conference tournament defeating their opponents in four games from first-round play through to the championship game. They received the conference's automatic bid to the 2022 NCAA Division I women's basketball tournament. Their season ended in the opening game of the NCAA tournament with a 51–55 loss to Howard University.

== Preseason polls ==
=== Southland Conference Poll ===
The Southland Conference released its preseason poll on October 25, 2022. Receiving 64 votes overall, the Cardinals were picked to finish seventh in the conference.

Predicted finish	Team	Votes (1st place)
1	Texas A&M–Corpus Christi	148 (11)
2	Houston Christian	131 (5)
3	Southeastern	122 (3)
4	Lamar	103
5	Texas A&M–Commerce Lions	101(1)
6	McNeese	98
7	Incarnate Word	64
8	Northwestern State	61
9	New Orleans	47
10	Nicholls	25

=== Preseason All Conference ===
No Cardinals were selected as members of the Preseason All Conference first team.

== Roster ==
2022–23 Incarnate Word Cardinals women's basketball team
Players
Coaches

Pos.	#	Name	Height	Year	Hometown
G	0	Hannah Wheeler	5 ft 6 in (1.68 m)	Jr	Cedar Park, TX
F	2	Kaylee Howell	6 ft 2 in (1.88 m)	Fr	Rockport, TX
G	3	Nina De Leon Negron	5 ft 6 in (1.68 m)	Jr	San Juan, PR
G	4	Sophia Griego	5 ft 10 in (1.78 m)	Fr	Austin, TX
G	5	Myra Bell	5 ft 10 in (1.78 m)	Jr	San Antonio, TX
G	10	Destiny Terrell	5 ft 9 in (1.75 m)	Jr	Dallas, TX
G	11	Aliyah Collins	5 ft 3 in (1.6 m)	Fr	College Station, TX
G	12	Paloma Simón	5 ft 11 in (1.8 m)	Fr	Alcobendas, Spain
F	13	Chloe Storer	6 ft 0 in (1.83 m)	Jr	Wangaratta, Australia
F	14	Brenna Perez	6 ft 0 in (1.83 m)	Jr	San Antonio, TX
F	15	Yuliyana Valcheva	6 ft 0 in (1.83 m)	GS	Varna, Bulgaria
F	22	Breelyn Sanborn	5 ft 11 in (1.8 m)	Fr	Spring, TX
G	32	Jorja Elliott	5 ft 11 in (1.8 m)	Fr	Hickory Creek, TX

Head coach

- Jeff Dow (Oregon)

Assistant coach(es)

- Amber Cunningham (Rice)
- Beverly Holmes (Millsaps)
- Rachel Baity (Our Lady of the Lake)

Legend

- (C) Team captain
- (S) Suspended
- (I) Ineligible
- (W) Walk-on
- Injured
- Current redshirt

Roster
Last update: April 9, 2024

== Schedule ==
Date time, TV	Rank^{#}	Opponent^{#}	Result	Record	Site (attendance) city, state
Non-conference regular season
Nov 7, 2022*; 5:30 pm, ESPN+		Our Lady of the Lake	W 63–56	1–0	McDermott Center (350); San Antonio, TX
Nov 10, 2022*; 7:00 pm, ESPN+		at Baylor	L 42–71	1–1	Ferrell Center (3809); San Antonio, TX
Nov 17, 2022*; 6:00 pm, ESPN+		Northern Colorado	L 54–63	1–2	Bank of Colorado Arena; Greeley, CO
Nov 20, 2022*; 2:00 pm, ESPN+		Texas Lutheran	W 50–42	2–2	McDermott Center (201); San Antonio, TX
Nov 29, 2022*; 12:00 pm, ESPN+		at TCU	L 33–60	2–3	Schollmaier Arena (2,108); Fort Worth, TX
Dec 4, 2022*; 2:00 pm, ESPN+		at Texas Tech	L 48–66	2–4	United Supermarkets Arena (4,297); Lubbock, TX
Dec 12, 2022*; 11:00 am, ESPN+		Schreiner University	W 92–41	3–4	McDermott Center (1,068); San Antonio, TX
Dec 15, 2022*; 6:00 pm, ESPN+		UTSA	W 56–53	4–4	McDermott Center (328); San Antonio, TX
Dec 18, 2022*; 2:00 pm, ESPN+		Sul Ross	W 77–36	5–4	McDermott Center (171); San Antonio, TX
Dec 21, 2022*; 1:00 pm, ESPN+		at SMU	L 44–57	5–5	Moody Coliseum (538); Dallas, TX
Southland regular season
Dec 31, 2022; 2:00 pm, ESPN+		at Texas A&M–Commerce	L 61–64	5–6 (0–1)	Texas A&M–Commerce Field House (312); Commerce, TX
Jan 4, 2023; 5:00 pm, ESPN+		at Texas A&M–Corpus Christi	L 51–59	5–7 (0–2)	Dugan Wellness Center (1.319); Corpus Christi, TX
Jan 7, 2023; 2:00 pm, ESPN+		Texas A&M–Corpus Christi	L 58–65	5–8 (0–3)	McDermott Center; San Antonio, TX
Jan 12, 2023; 5:30 pm, ESPN+		New Orleans	W 61–55	6–8 (1–3)	McDermott Center (204); San Antonio, TX
Jan 14, 2023; 2:00 pm, ESPN+		Southeastern Louisiana	W 55–49	7–8 (2–3)	McDermott Center (195); San Antonio, TX
Jan 19, 2023; 5:00 pm, ESPN+		at Houston Christian	L 52–71	7–9 (2–4)	Sharp Gymnasium (207); Houston, TX
Jan 21, 2023; 3:00 pm, ESPN+		at Lamar	L 52–72	7–10 (2–5)	Montagne Center (1,243); Beaumont, TX
Jan 26, 2023; 5:30 pm, ESPN+		McNeese	L 34–69	7–11 (2–6)	McDermott Center (201); San Antonio, TX
Jan 28, 2023; 2:00 pm, ESPN+		Nicholls	W 70–62	8–11 (3–6)	McDermott Center (268); San Antonio, TX
Feb 2, 2023; 5:00 pm, ESPN+		at Southeastern Louisiana	L 50–72	8–12 (3–7)	University Center (379); Hammond, LA
Feb 4, 2023; 2:00 pm, ESPN+		at New Orleans	W 50–45	9–12 (4–7)	Lakefront Arena (284); New Orleans, LA
Feb 9, 2023; 5:30 pm, ESPN+		Lamar	L 67–74	9–13 (4–8)	McDermott Center; San Antonio, TX
Feb 11, 2023; 2:00 pm, ESPN+		Houston Christian	W 65–49	10–13 (5–8)	McDermott Center (170); San Antonio, TX
Feb 16, 2023; 5:00 pm, ESPN+		at McNeese	W 69–45	11–13 (6–8)	The Legacy Center (1,753); Lake Charles, LA
Feb 18, 2023; 1:00 pm, ESPN+		at Nicholls	W 65–50	12–13 (7–8)	Stopher Gymnasium (313); Thibodaux, LA
Feb 23, 2023; 5:30 pm, ESPN+		Northwestern State	W 67–58	13–13 (8–8)	McDermott Center (135); San Antonio, TX
Feb 25, 2023; 2:00 pm, ESPN3		Texas A&M–Commerce	W 73–62	14–13 (9–8)	McDermott Center; San Antonio, TX
Mar 1, 2023; 5:30 pm, ESPN+		Northwestern State	W 79–60	15–13 (10–8)	Prather Coliseum (601); Natchitoches, LA
2023 Jersey Mike's Subs Southland basketball tournament
Mar 7, 2023; 11:00 am, ESPN+	(4)	vs. (5) Texas A&M–Commerce; Second round	L 62–65	15–14	The Legacy Center; Lake Charles, LA
*Non-conference game. ^{#}Rankings from AP Poll. (#) Tournament seedings in parentheses. All times are in Central.

== See also ==
- 2022–23 Incarnate Word Cardinals men's basketball team
