= 2022–23 New Orleans Privateers women's basketball team =

Intercollegiate basketball season

2022–23 New Orleans Privateers women's basketball
- Conference: Southland Conference
- Record: 8–20 (7–11 Southland)
- Head coach: Keeshawn Davenport (12th season)
- Assistant coaches: Wyketha Harrell; Alpha English; Kristin Moore
- Home arena: Lakefront Arena

2022–23 Southland Conference women's basketball standings
	Conf.				Overall
Team	W		L	PCT	W		L	PCT
Southeastern Louisiana †	14	–	4	.778	21	–	10	.677
Texas A&M–Corpus Christi	14	–	4	.778	19	–	12	.613
Lamar	12	–	6	.667	20	–	12	.625
Incarnate Word	10	–	8	.556	15	–	14	.517
Texas A&M–Commerce*	10	–	8	.556	14	–	19	.424
McNeese	8	–	10	.444	12	–	19	.387
New Orleans	7	–	11	.389	8	–	20	.286
Northwestern State	7	–	11	.389	11	–	18	.379
Houston Christian	6	–	12	.333	11	–	18	.379
Nicholls	2	–	16	.111	5	–	24	.172
† 2023 Southland tournament winner * ineligible for the 2023 NCAA tournament due to transition period As of March 18, 2023

The 2022–23 New Orleans Privateers women's basketball team represented the University of New Orleans (UNO) during the 2022–23 NCAA Division I women's basketball season. The Privateers were led by twelfth-year head coach Keeshawn Davenport and played their home games at the Lakefront Arena located on the UNO campus in New Orleans, Louisiana. They were members of the Southland Conference.

== Previous season ==
The Privateers finished the 2021–22 season with a 5–18 overall record and a 3–11 Southland Conference record, seventh place in the conference. They participated in the 2022 Southland Conference women's basketball tournament as the No. 7-seeded team. The Privateers won their first-round tournament game against No. 6-seeded Northwestern State 57–48. Their season ended with a quarterfinal loss to No. 4-seeded Southeastern Louisiana 66–80.

== Preseason polls ==
=== Southland Conference Poll ===
The Southland Conference released its preseason poll on October 25, 2022. Receiving 47 votes overall, the Privateers were picked to finish ninth in the conference.

Predicted finish	Team	Votes (1st place)
1	Texas A&M–Corpus Christi	148 (11)
2	Houston Christian	131 (5)
3	Southeastern	122 (3)
4	Lamar	103
5	Texas A&M–Commerce Lions	101(1)
6	McNeese	98
7	Incarnate Word	64
8	Northwestern State	61
9	New Orleans	47
10	Nicholls	25

=== Preseason All Conference ===
No Privateers were selected as members of the Preseason All Conference first team.

== Roster ==
2022–23 New Orleans Privateers women's basketball team
Players
Coaches

Pos.	#	Name	Height	Year	Hometown
C	00	Nora Francois	6 ft 2 in (1.88 m)	So	Minneapolis, MN
G	1	Hennessey Luu-Brown	5 ft 7 in (1.7 m)	Jr	Toronto, ON
F	3	Najha Scott	6 ft 1 in (1.85 m)	Jr	Shreveport, LA
G	4	Kristen Crenshaw-Gill	5 ft 9 in (1.75 m)	So	Youngstown, OH
G	5	Tianna Gipson	5 ft 4 in (1.63 m)	Sr	Kansas City, MO
G	10	Tomyree Thompson	5 ft 9 in (1.75 m)	So	New Orleans, LA
G	11	Imani Williams	5 ft 8 in (1.73 m)	Fr	Hopkins, SC
G	14	Kyla Davis	5 ft 9 in (1.75 m)	So	Fort Worth, TX
G	20	Justice Ross	6 ft 0 in (1.83 m)	RS Jr	Des Moines, IA
F/C	21	Tara Green	6 ft 3 in (1.91 m)	Jr	West Helena, AR
G	23	DeArica Pryor	5 ft 7 in (1.7 m)	Sr	Urbandale, IA
F	31	Zoe Cooper	5 ft 11 in (1.8 m)	So	Birmingham, AL
G	32	Brianna Ellis	5 ft 8 in (1.73 m)	So	Palm Coast, FL
G	33	Jayla Kimbrough	5 ft 9 in (1.75 m)	RS Fr	Decatur, GA

Head coach

- Keeshawn Davenport (New Orleans)

Assistant coach(es)

- Wyketha Harrell (Rockhurst / Missouri Southern)
- Alpha English (San José State)
- Kristin Moore (Tyler Junior College / St. John's)

Legend

- (C) Team captain
- (S) Suspended
- (I) Ineligible
- (W) Walk-on
- Injured
- Current redshirt

Roster
Last update: April 20, 2025

== Schedule ==
Date time, TV	Rank^{#}	Opponent^{#}	Result	Record	Site (attendance) city, state
Non-conference regular season
November 7, 2022*; 8:00 p.m., CUSATV		at UTEP	L 55–83	0–1	Don Haskins Center (758); El Paso, TX
November 14, 2022*; 7:00 p.m., ESPN+		South Alabama	W 71–63	1–1	Lakefront Arena (647); New Orleans, LA
November 18, 2022*; 6:00 p.m.		at Grambling	L 59–69	1–2	Fredrick C. Hobdy Assembly Center (203); Grambling, LA
November 22, 2022*; 6:00 p.m.		at Alcorn State	L 56–65	1–3	Davey Whitney Complex; Lorman, MS
November 30, 2022*; 6:00 p.m.		at Tulane	L 37–90	1–4	Devlin Fieldhouse (445); New Orleans, LA
December 3, 2022*; 2:00 p.m., ESPN+		at Wichita State	L 61–79	1–5	Charles Koch Arena (1,241); Wichita, KS
December 11, 2022*; 2:00 p.m.		at No. 11 LSU	Cancelled		Pete Maravich Assembly Center; Baton Rouge, LA
December 14, 2022*; 11:00 a.m., ESPN+		Mississippi Valley State	L 63–67 ^{OT}	1–6	Lakefront Arena (410); New Orleans, LA
December 18, 2022*; 1:00 p.m., BTN		at Rutgers	L 56–64	1–7	Jersey Mike's Arena (1,016); Piscataway, NJ
December 21, 2022*; 6:00 p.m., FloHoops		at Hofstra	L 60–64	1–8	Mack Sports Complex (296); Hempstead, NY
Southland regular season
December 31, 2022; 12:00 p.m., ESPN+		at Houston Christian	L 59–68	1–9 (0–1)	Sharp Gymnasium (375); Houston, TX
January 5, 2023; 5:00 p.m., ESPN+		Lamar	W 60–46	2–9 (1–1)	Lakefront Arena; New Orleans, LA
January 7, 2023; 2:00 p.m., ESPN+		Houston Christian	L 54–62	2–10 (1–2)	Lakefront Arena; New Orleans, LA
January 12, 2023; 5:30 p.m., ESPN+		at Incarnate Word	L 55–61	2–11 (1–3)	McDermott Center (204); San Antonio, TX
January 14, 2023; 1:00 p.m., ESPN+		at Texas A&M–Corpus Christi	L 45–58	2–12 (1–4)	American Bank Center (1,137); Corpus Christi, TX
January 19, 2023; 5:00 p.m., ESPN+		Texas A&M–Commerce	L 69–74	2–13 (1–5)	Lakefront Arena (381); New Orleans, LA
January 21, 2023; 2:00 p.m., ESPN+		Northwestern State	W 70–59	3–13 (2–5)	Lakefront Arena (213); New Orleans, LA
January 26, 2023; 5:00 p.m., ESPN+		at Southeastern Louisiana	L 51–69	3–14 (2–6)	University Center (519); Hammond, LA
January 28, 2023; 2:00 p.m., ESPN+		Southeastern Louisiana	W 59–42	4–14 (3–6)	Lakefront Arena (412); New Orleans, LA
February 2, 2023; 5:00 p.m., ESPN+		Texas A&M–Corpus Christi	L 49–68	4–15 (3–7)	Lakefront Arena (309); New Orleans, LA
February 4, 2023; 2:00 p.m., ESPN+		Incarnate Word	L 45–59	4–16 (3–8)	Lakefront Arena (284); New Orleans, LA
February 9, 2023; 5:00 p.m., ESPN+		at Nicholls	W 83–68	5–16 (4–8)	Stopher Gymnasium (268); Thibodaux, LA
February 11, 2023; 2:00 p.m., ESPN+		McNeese	W 65–59	6–16 (5–8)	Lakefront Arena (613); New Orleans, LA
February 16, 2023; 5:30 p.m., ESPN+		at Texas A&M–Commerce	L 70–83	6–17 (5–9)	The Field House (217); Commerce, TX
February 18, 2023; 1:00 p.m., ESPN+		at Northwestern State	L 81–82 ^{OT}	6–18 (5–10)	Prather Coliseum (501); Natchitoches, LA
February 23, 2023; 5:00 p.m., ESPN+		Nicholls	W 88–73	7–18 (6–10)	Lakefront Arena (395); New Orleans, LA
February 25, 2023; 3:00 p.m., ESPN+		at Lamar	W 62–61	8–18 (7–10)	Montagne Center (1,458); Beaumont, TX
March 1, 2023; 5:00 p.m., ESPN+		at McNeese	L 56–68	8–19 (7–11)	The Legacy Center (1,566); Lake Charles, LA
2023 Jersey Mike's Subs Southland Basketball Tournament
March 6, 2023; 1:30 p.m., ESPN+	(7)	at (6) McNeese; First round	L 82–87	8–20	The Legacy Center (448); Lake Charles, LA
*Non-conference game. ^{#}Rankings from AP poll. (#) Tournament seedings in parentheses. All times are in Central.

== See also ==
- 2022–23 New Orleans Privateers men's basketball team
