= 2023 Southland Conference women's basketball tournament =

- Classification: Division I
- Season: 2022–23
- Teams: 8
- Site: The Legacy Center; Lake Charles, Louisiana
- Champions: Southeastern Louisiana (1st title)
- Winning coach: Ayla Guzzardo (1st title)
- MVP: Hailey Giaratano (Southeastern Louisiana)
- Attendance: 606 (championship)
- Television: ESPN+, ESPNU

The 2023 Southland Conference women's basketball tournament was the postseason women's basketball championship for the Southland Conference. The tournament took place March 6–9, 2023. The tournament winner received an automatic invitation to the 2023 NCAA Division I women's basketball tournament.

2022–23 Southland Conference women's basketball standings
| | Conf. | | | | Overall |
| Team | W | | L | PCT | W | | L | PCT |
|---|---|---|---|---|---|---|---|---|
| Southeastern Louisiana † | 14 | – | 4 | .778 | 21 | – | 10 | .677 |
| Texas A&M–Corpus Christi | 14 | – | 4 | .778 | 19 | – | 12 | .613 |
| Lamar | 12 | – | 6 | .667 | 20 | – | 12 | .625 |
| Incarnate Word | 10 | – | 8 | .556 | 15 | – | 14 | .517 |
| Texas A&M–Commerce* | 10 | – | 8 | .556 | 14 | – | 19 | .424 |
| McNeese | 8 | – | 10 | .444 | 12 | – | 19 | .387 |
| New Orleans | 7 | – | 11 | .389 | 8 | – | 20 | .286 |
| Northwestern State | 7 | – | 11 | .389 | 11 | – | 18 | .379 |
| Houston Christian | 6 | – | 12 | .333 | 11 | – | 18 | .379 |
| Nicholls | 2 | – | 16 | .111 | 5 | – | 24 | .172 |
† 2023 Southland tournament winner * ineligible for the 2023 NCAA tournament due to transition period As of March 18, 2023

== Seeds ==
Teams were seeded by record within the conference, with a tie-breaker system to seed teams with identical conference records. The top eight teams in the conference qualified for the tournament. The top two seeds received double byes into the semifinals in the merit-based format. The No. 3 and No. 4 seeds received single byes to the quarterfinals. Tiebreakers used are 1) Head-to-head results, 2) comparison of records against individual teams in the conference starting with the top-ranked team(s) and working down and 3) NCAA NET rankings available on the day following the conclusion of regular-season play.

| Seed | School | Conference | Tiebreaker |
|---|---|---|---|
| 1 | Southeastern Louisiana | 14–4 | 2-0 vs. Texas A&M–Corpus Christi |
| 2 | Texas A&M–Corpus Christi | 14–4 | 0-2 vs. Southeastern Louisiana |
| 3 | Lamar | 12–6 | |
| 4 | Incarnate Word | 10–8 | 1-1 vs. Texas A&M–Commerce; 1-3 vs. Southeastern Louisiana & Texas A&M–Corpus Christi |
| 5 | Texas A&M–Commerce | 10–8 | 1-1 vs. Incarnate Word; 0-4 vs. Southeastern Louisiana & Texas A&M–Corpus Christi |
| 6 | McNeese | 8–10 | |
| 7 | New Orleans | 7–11 | 1-1 vs. Northwestern State; 1-3 vs. Southeastern Louisiana & Texas A&M–Corpus Christi |
| 8 | Northwestern State | 7–11 | 1-1 vs. New Orleans; 0-4 vs. Southeastern Louisiana & Texas A&M–Corpus Christi |

== Schedule ==
| Session | Game | Time* | Matchup^{#} | Score | Television | Attendance |
First round – Monday, March 6, 2023
| 1 | 1 | 11:00 am | No. 5 Texas A&M–Commerce vs. No. 8 Northwestern State | 79–66 | ESPN+ | 448 |
| 1 | 2 | 1:30 pm | No. 6 McNeese vs. No. 7 New Orleans | 87–82^{OT} | ESPN+ | 448 |
Quarterfinals – Tuesday, March 7, 2023
| 2 | 3 | 11:00 am | No. 4 Incarnate Word vs. No. 5 Texas A&M–Commerce | 62–65 | ESPN+ | 453 |
| 2 | 4 | 1:30 pm | No. 3 Lamar vs. No. 6 McNeese | 80–75^{OT} | ESPN+ | 453 |
Semifinals – Wednesday, March 9, 2023
| 3 | 5 | 11:00 am | No. 1 Southeastern Louisiana vs. No. 5 Texas A&M-Commerce | 60–58^{OT} | ESPN+ | |
| 3 | 6 | 1:30 pm | No. 2 Texas A&M–Corpus Christi vs. No. 3 Lamar | 53–65 | ESPN+ | |
Championship – Thursday, March 9, 2023
| 4 | 7 | 4:00 pm | No. 1 Southeastern Louisiana vs. No. 3 Lamar | 66–57 | ESPNU | 606 |
*Game times in CDT. #-Rankings denote tournament seeding.

== Bracket ==
First round Monday, March 6 ESPN+
5 | Texas A&M–Commerce | 79
8 | Northwestern State | 66
6 | McNeese | 87*
7 | New Orleans | 82

Second round Tuesday, March 7 ESPN+
4 | Incarnate Word | 62
5 | Texas A&M–Commerce | 65
3 | Lamar | 80*
6 | McNeese | 75

Semifinals; Wednesday, March 8 ESPN+
1 | Southeastern Louisiana | 60*
5 | Texas A&M-Commerce | 58
2 | Texas A&M–Corpus Christi | 53
3 | Lamar | 65

Championship; Thursday, March 9 ESPNU
1 | Southeastern Louisiana | 66
3 | Lamar | 57

* denotes number of overtime periods

== Awards and honors ==
2023 Southland Conference Women's Basketball All-Tournament Team
- Haley Giaratano, Southeastern Louisiana (MVP)
- Taylor Bell, Southeastern Louisiana
- Akasha Davis, Lamar
- Portia Adams, Lamar
- DesiRay Kernal, Texas A&M–Commerce

== See also ==
- 2023 Southland Conference men's basketball tournament
- Southland Conference women's basketball tournament
