= 2022–23 Northwestern State Lady Demons basketball team =

Intercollegiate basketball season

2022–23 Northwestern State Lady Demons basketball
- Conference: Southland Conference
- Record: 11–18 (7–11 Southland)
- Head coach: Anna Nimz (3rd season)
- Assistant coaches: Leasa Ailshie; Mike Brown; Mike Pittman
- Home arena: Prather Coliseum (Capacity: 3,900)

2022–23 Southland Conference women's basketball standings
	Conf.				Overall
Team	W		L	PCT	W		L	PCT
Southeastern Louisiana †	14	–	4	.778	21	–	10	.677
Texas A&M–Corpus Christi	14	–	4	.778	19	–	12	.613
Lamar	12	–	6	.667	20	–	12	.625
Incarnate Word	10	–	8	.556	15	–	14	.517
Texas A&M–Commerce*	10	–	8	.556	14	–	19	.424
McNeese	8	–	10	.444	12	–	19	.387
New Orleans	7	–	11	.389	8	–	20	.286
Northwestern State	7	–	11	.389	11	–	18	.379
Houston Christian	6	–	12	.333	11	–	18	.379
Nicholls	2	–	16	.111	5	–	24	.172
† 2023 Southland tournament winner * ineligible for the 2023 NCAA tournament due to transition period As of March 18, 2023

The 2022–23 Northwestern State Lady Demons basketball team represented Northwestern State University during the 2022–23 NCAA Division I women's basketball season. The Demons, led by third year head coach Anna Nimz, played their home games at Prather Coliseum located in Natchitoches, Louisiana and were members of the Southland Conference.

They finished the season with a 11–18 record overall and a 7–11 record in Southland Conference play, to finish in a tie for seventh place. They lost in the first round of the Southland Conference tournament to Texas A&M–Commerce.

== Previous season ==
The Lady Demons finished the 2021–22 season with a 12–14 record overall and a 5–9 record in Southland Conference play, to finish in a tie for fifth place. They were the No. 6 seed in the 2022 Southland Conference tournament after losing the head-to-head tie-breaker with No. 5-seeded Incarnate Word. Their season ended with a first-round loss in tournament play to No. 7 seed New Orleans.

== Preseason polls ==
=== Southland Conference Poll ===
The Southland Conference released its preseason poll on October 25, 2022. Receiving 61 votes, the Lady Demons were picked to finish eighth in the conference.

Predicted finish	Team	Votes (1st place)
1	Texas A&M–Corpus Christi	148 (11)
2	Houston Christian	131 (5)
3	Southeastern	122 (3)
4	Lamar	103
5	Texas A&M–Commerce Lions	101(1)
6	McNeese	98
7	Incarnate Word	64
8	Northwestern State	61
9	New Orleans	47
10	Nicholls	25

=== Preseason All Conference ===
Candice Parramore was selected to the Preseason All Conference first team.

== Roster ==
2022–23 Northwestern State Demons women's basketball team
Players
Coaches

Pos.	#	Name	Height	Year	Hometown
G	1	Kayla Hampton	5 ft 9 in (1.75 m)	Fr	Bossier City, LA
G	3	Jiselle Woodson	5 ft 5 in (1.65 m)	Jr	Corner, AL
G	4	Karmelah Dean	5 ft 7 in (1.7 m)	Jr	Seattle, WA
G	5	Kelsey Thaxton	5 ft 9 in (1.75 m)	GS	Many, LA
G	10	Shelby Rayner	5 ft 5 in (1.65 m)	Jr	Ulverstone, Australia
F	11	Jasmin Dixon	6 ft 3 in (1.91 m)	So	Spring, TX
G	12	Ivona Miljanic	6 ft 0 in (1.83 m)	Fr	Belgrade, Serbia
G	14	Gabrielle Robinson-Forde	6 ft 2 in (1.88 m)	RS Fr	Brampton, ON
G	15	Candice Parramore	5 ft 7 in (1.7 m)	Sr	Dallas, TX
G	20	Jordan McLemore	5 ft 11 in (1.8 m)	So	Shreveport, LA
G	21	Alecia Whyte	5 ft 10 in (1.78 m)	Jr	Houston, TX
F	22	Joelle Johnson	5 ft 11 in (1.8 m)	Sr	Louisville, KY
C	24	Jordan Todd	6 ft 1 in (1.85 m)	Jr	Eagle River, AK
C	32	Madison Moles	6 ft 6 in (1.98 m)	Fr	Fresno, CA
G	33	Bengisu Alper	5 ft 11 in (1.8 m)	GS	Istanbul, Turkey
G	35	Sharna Ayres	5 ft 10 in (1.78 m)	Jr	Melbourne, Australia

Head coach

- Anna Nimz (Pittsburg State)

Assistant coach(es)

- Leasa Ailshie (Sam Houston State)
- Mike Brown (Drake)
- Mike Pittman Grambling State)

Legend

- (C) Team captain
- (S) Suspended
- (I) Ineligible
- (W) Walk-on
- Injured
- Current redshirt

Roster
Last update: September 13, 2025

== Schedule ==
Date time, TV	Rank^{#}	Opponent^{#}	Result	Record	Site (attendance) city, state
Non-conference regular season
November 7, 2022*; 5:30 p.m., ESPN+		LeTourneau	W 79–34	1–0	Prather Coliseum (552); Natchitoches, LA
November 11, 2022*; 6:30 p.m.		at Oklahoma State	L 51–89	1–1	Gallagher-Iba Arena (1,657); Stillwater, OK
November 17, 2022*; 5:30 p.m., ESPN+		Southern	L 52–56	1–2	Prather Coliseum (408); Natchitoches, LA
November 20, 2022*; 2:00 p.m., SECN+		at No. 15 LSU	L 45–100	1–3	Pete Maravich Assembly Center (5,318); Baton Rouge, LA
November 26, 2022*; 1:00 p.m., ESPN+		Arkansas Baptist	W 79–41	2–3	Prather Coliseum (427); Natchitoches, LA
November 30, 2022*; 6:00 p.m., ESPN+		at Oklahoma	L 45–88	2–4	Lloyd Noble Center (2,198); Norman, OK
December 4, 2022*; 1:00 p.m., ESPN+		Champion Christian College	W 65–60	3–4	Prather Coliseum (220); Natchitoches, LA
December 10, 2022*; 1:00 p.m., ESPN+		Louisiana–Monroe	W 79–52	4–4	Prather Coliseum (865); Natchitoches, LA
December 14, 2022*; 6:00 p.m., ESPN+		at Tarleton State	L 46–67	4–5	Wisdom Gymnasium (824); Stephenville, TX
December 19, 2022*; 6:30 p.m., ESPN+		at Tulsa	L 64–96	4–6	Reynolds Center (1,127); Tulsa, OK
Southland Conference schedule
December 30, 2022; 1:00 p.m., ESPN+		Texas A&M–Corpus Christi	L 50–65	4–7 (0–1)	Prather Coliseum (485); Natchitoches, LA
January 5, 2023; 5:00 p.m., ESPN+		at McNeese	L 65–71	4–8 (0–2)	The Legacy Center (2,776); Lake Charles, LA
January 7, 2023; 1:00 p.m., ESPN+		Nicholls	W 67–58	5–8 (1–2)	Prather Coliseum (1,071); Natchitoches, LA
January 12, 2023; 5:30 p.m., ESPN+		McNeese	W 62–61	6–8 (2–2)	Prather Coliseum (773); Natchitoches, LA
January 14, 2023; 1:00 p.m., ESPN+		at Nicholls	W 76–64	7–8 (3–2)	Stopher Gymnasium (311); Thibodaux, LA
January 19, 2023; 5:00 p.m., ESPN+		at Southeastern Louisiana	L 48–63	7–9 (3–3)	University Center (683); Hammond, LA
January 21, 2023; 2:00 p.m., ESPN+		at New Orleans	L 59–70	7–10 (3–4)	Lakefront Arena (213); New Orleans, LA
January 26, 2023; 5:30 p.m., ESPN+		Houston Christian	W 59–48	8–10 (4–4)	Prather Coliseum (805); Natchitoches, LA
January 28, 2023; 1:00 p.m., ESPN+		Lamar	W 54–52	9–10 (5–4)	Prather Coliseum (891); Natchitoches, LA
February 2, 2023; 5:00 p.m., ESPN+		at Houston Christian	L 58–69	9–11 (5–5)	Sharp Gymnasium (367); Houston, TX
February 4, 2023; 3:00 p.m., ESPN+		at Lamar	L 57–75	9–12 (5–6)	Montagne Center (1,206); Beaumont, TX
February 9, 2023; 5:30 p.m., ESPN+		at Texas A&M–Commerce	L 47–67	9–13 (5–7)	The Field House (277); Commerce, TX
February 11, 2023; 1:00 p.m., ESPN+		Texas A&M–Commerce	W 71–66	10–13 (6–7)	Prather Coliseum (905); Natchitoches, LA
February 16, 2023; 5:30 p.m., ESPN+		Southeastern Louisiana	L 50–65	10–14 (6–8)	Prather Coliseum (716); Natchitoches, LA
February 18, 2023; 1:00 p.m., ESPN3		New Orleans	W 82–81 ^{OT}	11–14 (7–8)	Prather Coliseum (501); Natchitoches, LA
February 23, 2023; 5:30 p.m., ESPN+		at Incarnate Word	L 58–67	11–15 (7–9)	McDermott Center (135); San Antonio, TX
February 25, 2023; 1:00 p.m., ESPN3		at Texas A&M–Corpus Christi	L 54–82	11–16 (7–10)	American Bank Center (1,229); Corpus Christi, TX
March 1, 2023; 5:30 p.m., ESPN+		Incarnate Word	L 60–79	11–17 (7–11)	Prather Coliseum (601); Natchitoches, LA
2023 Jersey Mike's Subs Southland Basketball Tournament
March 6, 2023; 11:00 p.m., ESPN+	(8)	vs. (5) Texas A&M–Commerce; First round	L 66–79	11–18	The Legacy Center; Lake Charles, LA
*Non-conference game. ^{#}Rankings from AP poll. (#) Tournament seedings in parentheses. All times are in Central.

== See also ==
- 2022–23 Northwestern State Demons basketball team
