= 2022–23 Nicholls Colonels women's basketball team =

Intercollegiate basketball season

2022–23 Nicholls Colonels women's basketball
- Conference: Southland Conference
- Record: 5–24 (2–16 Southland)
- Head coach: DoBee Plaisance (15th season)
- Assistant coaches: Jaime Gonzales; Cassidy Barrios; Kalyn Banks
- Home arena: Stopher Gym

2022–23 Southland Conference women's basketball standings
| | Conf. | | | | Overall |
| Team | W | | L | PCT | W | | L | PCT |
|---|---|---|---|---|---|---|---|---|
| Southeastern Louisiana † | 14 | – | 4 | .778 | 21 | – | 10 | .677 |
| Texas A&M–Corpus Christi | 14 | – | 4 | .778 | 19 | – | 12 | .613 |
| Lamar | 12 | – | 6 | .667 | 20 | – | 12 | .625 |
| Incarnate Word | 10 | – | 8 | .556 | 15 | – | 14 | .517 |
| Texas A&M–Commerce* | 10 | – | 8 | .556 | 14 | – | 19 | .424 |
| McNeese | 8 | – | 10 | .444 | 12 | – | 19 | .387 |
| New Orleans | 7 | – | 11 | .389 | 8 | – | 20 | .286 |
| Northwestern State | 7 | – | 11 | .389 | 11 | – | 18 | .379 |
| Houston Christian | 6 | – | 12 | .333 | 11 | – | 18 | .379 |
| Nicholls | 2 | – | 16 | .111 | 5 | – | 24 | .172 |
† 2023 Southland tournament winner * ineligible for the 2023 NCAA tournament due to transition period As of March 18, 2023

The 2022–23 Nicholls Colonels women's basketball team represented Nicholls State University during the 2022–23 NCAA Division I women's basketball season. The Colonels, led by fifteenth year head coach DoBee Plaisance, played their home games at Stopher Gym located in Thibodaux, Louisiana as members of the Southland Conference. The Colonels finished the 2022–23 season with a 5–24 overall record and a 2–16 record for last place in Southland Conference play. They failed to qualify for the 2023 Southland Conference women's basketball tournament.

== Previous season ==
The Colonels finished the 2021–22 season with a 4–22 overall record and a 2–12 record in Southland Conference play. They participated in the 2022 Southland Conference women's basketball tournament as the No. 8 seed. Their season ended with a first round 73–74 defeat to No. 5 seeded Incarnate Word.

== Preseason polls ==
=== Southland Conference Poll ===
The Southland Conference released its preseason poll on October 25, 2022. Receiving 25 votes overall, the Colonels were picked to finish tenth in the conference.

| Predicted finish | Team | Votes (1st place) |
|---|---|---|
| 1 | Texas A&M–Corpus Christi | 148 (11) |
| 2 | Houston Christian | 131 (5) |
| 3 | Southeastern | 122 (3) |
| 4 | Lamar | 103 |
| 5 | Texas A&M–Commerce Lions | 101(1) |
| 6 | McNeese | 98 |
| 7 | Incarnate Word | 64 |
| 8 | Northwestern State | 61 |
| 9 | New Orleans | 47 |
| 10 | Nicholls | 25 |

=== Preseason All Conference ===
No Colonels were selected as members of the Preseason All Conference first team.

== Roster ==
2022–23 Nicholls Colonels women's basketball team
Players
Coaches

| Pos. | # | Name | Height | Year | Hometown |
|---|---|---|---|---|---|
| G | 0 | Amelia Sandie | 5 ft 7 in (1.7 m) | So | Brighton, England |
| G | 4 | Madison Gill | 5 ft 7 in (1.7 m) | RS So | Ponchatoula, LA |
| G | 5 | Traya Bruce | 5 ft 7 in (1.7 m) | RS Sr | Cut Off, LA |
| G | 10 | Kayla Keshmeshian | 5 ft 10 in (1.78 m) | Fr | Westlake Village, CA |
| G | 11 | Adrian Mann | 5 ft 8 in (1.73 m) | RS Sr | Mokane, MO |
| G | 12 | Kyla Hamilton | 5 ft 6 in (1.68 m) | Jr | Westlake, LA |
| F | 21 | Lexi Alexander | 6 ft 0 in (1.83 m) | Fr | Round Rock, TX |
| G/F | 22 | Deonna Brister | 5 ft 11 in (1.8 m) | So | Lake Arthur, LA |
| G | 23 | Malaysia DePrisco | 5 ft 9 in (1.75 m) | Fr | Austin, TX |
| F | 24 | Khia Lee | 5 ft 10 in (1.78 m) | So | Manchester, England |
| C | 30 | Kate Manley | 6 ft 4 in (1.93 m) | Jr | Roswell, GA |
| G | 32 | Kyrstin Green | 5 ft 2 in (1.57 m) | Jr | Lafayette, IN |

Head coach

- Dobee Plaisance (LSU)

Assistant coach(es)

- Jaime Gonzales (Sam Houston State)
- Cassidy Barrios (Nicholls State)
- Kalyn Banks Randolph College

Legend

- (C) Team captain
- (S) Suspended
- (I) Ineligible
- (W) Walk-on
- Injured
- Current redshirt

Roster
Last update: November 11, 2022

== Schedule ==
| Date time, TV | Rank^{#} | Opponent^{#} | Result | Record | Site (attendance) city, state |
Non-conference regular season
| Nov 10, 2022*; 11:30 am | | Mobile | W 70–61 | 1–0 | Stopher Gymnasium (232); Thibodaux, LA |
| Nov 13, 2022*; 1:00 pm | | Alabama A&M | W 60–55 | 2–0 | Stopher Gymnasium (202); Thibodaux, LA |
| Nov 15, 2022*; 6:00 pm, CUSA.tv | | at UAB | L 40–69 | 2–1 | Bartow Arena (128); Birmingham, AL |
| Nov 18, 2022*; 6:00 pm | | Grand Canyon | L 41–79 | 2–2 | Stopher Gymnasium (225); Thibodaux, LA |
| Nov 22, 2022*; 1:00 pm | | at Mississippi Valley State | L 49–64 | 2–3 | Harrison HPER Complex (789); Itta Bena, MS |
| Nov 25, 2022*; 3:00 pm, ESPN+ | | at Southern Miss; Lady Eagle Thanksgiving Tournament | L 68–83 | 2–4 | Reed Green Coliseum (893); Hattiesburg, MS |
| Nov 26, 2022*; 3:00 pm | | vs. Mississippi Valley State; Lady Eagle Thanksgiving Tournament | W 84–74 | 3–4 | Reed Green Coliseum (811); Hattiesburg, MS |
| Nov 29, 2022*; 5:00 pm, ESPN+ | | New Mexico | L 55–72 | 3–5 | Stopher Gymnasium (225); Thibodaux, LA |
| Dec 14, 2022*; 6:00 pm, ESPN+ | | South Alabama | L 73–74 | 3–6 | Stopher Gymnasium (224); Thibodaux, LA |
| Dec 19, 2022*; 6:00 pm, ESPN+ | | at Abilene Christian | L 36–76 | 3–7 | Moody Coliseum (654); Abilene, TX |
| Dec 21, 2022*; 1:00 pm, ESPN+ | | at TCU | L 32–75 | 3–8 | Schollmaier Arena (1,323); Fort Worth, TX |
Southland regular season
| Dec 31, 2022; 1:00 pm, ESPN+ | | Southeastern Louisiana | L 49–57 | 3–9 (0–1) | Stopher Gymnasium (202); Thibodaux, LA |
| Jan 5, 2023; 5:00 pm, ESPN+ | | at Texas A&M–Commerce | L 48–81 | 3–10 (0–2) | The Field House (211); Commerce, TX |
| Jan 7, 2023; 1:00 pm, ESPN+ | | at Northwestern State | L 58–67 | 3–11 (0–3) | Prather Coliseum (1,071); Natchitoches, LA |
| Jan 12, 2023; 5:00 pm, ESPN+ | | at Lamar | W 80–74 ^{OT} | 4–11 (1–3) | Montagne Center (1,127); Beaumont, TX |
| Jan 14, 2023; 1:00 pm, ESPN+ | | Northwestern State | L 64–76 | 4–12 (1–4) | Stopher Gymnasium (311); Thibodaux, LA |
| Jan 19, 2023; 5:00 pm, ESPN+ | | McNeese | L 68–77 | 4–13 (1–5) | Stopher Gymnasium (611); Thibodaux, LA |
| Jan 21, 2023; 1:00 pm, ESPN+ | | at McNeese | L 62–70 | 4–14 (1–6) | The Legacy Center (2,173); Lake Charles, LA |
| Jan 26, 2023; 5:00 pm, ESPN+ | | at Texas A&M–Corpus Christi | L 47–86 | 4–15 (1–7) | American Bank Center (1,027); Corpus Christi, TX |
| Jan 28, 2023; 1:00 pm, ESPN+ | | at Incarnate Word | L 62–70 | 4–16 (1–8) | McDermott Center (268); San Antonio, TX |
| Feb 2, 2023; 5:00 pm, ESPN+ | | Texas A&M–Commerce | Game postponed until Feb 20 due to icy weather conditions in Texas. | | Stopher Gymnasium; Thibodaux, LA |
| Feb 4, 2023; 1:00 pm, ESPN+ | | at Houston Christian | L 55–68 | 4–17 (1–9) | Sharp Gymnasium (136); Houston, TX |
| Feb 9, 2023; 5:00 pm, ESPN+ | | New Orleans | L 68–83 | 4–18 (1–10) | Stopher Gymnasium (268); Thibodaux, LA |
| Feb 11, 2023; 1:00 pm, ESPN+ | | at Southeastern Louisiana | L 52–90 | 4–10 (1–11) | University Center (334); Hammond, LA |
| Feb 16, 2023; 5:00 pm, ESPN+ | | Texas A&M–Corpus Christi | L 50–59 | 4–20 (1–12) | Stopher Gymnasium (434); Thibodaux, LA |
| Feb 18, 2023; 1:00 pm, ESPN+ | | Incarnate Word | L 50–65 | 4–21 (1–13) | Stopher Gymnasium (313); Thibodaux, LA |
| Feb 20, 2023; 5:00 pm, ESPN+ | | Texas A&M–Commerce | L 70–77 | 4–22 (1–14) | Stopher Gymnasium (219); Thibodaux, LA |
| Feb 23, 2023; 5:00 pm, ESPN+ | | at New Orleans | L 73–88 | 4–23 (1–15) | Lakefront Arena (395); New Orleans, LA |
| Feb 25, 2023; 1:00 pm, ESPN3 | | Houston Christian | W 64–46 | 5–23 (2–15) | Stopher Gymnasium (311); Thibodaux, LA |
| Mar 1, 2023; 5:00 pm, ESPN+ | | Lamar | L 57–70 | 5–24 (2–16) | Stopher Gymnasium (344); Thibodaux, LA |
*Non-conference game. ^{#}Rankings from AP Poll. (#) Tournament seedings in parentheses. All times are in Central Time.

== See also ==
- 2022–23 Nicholls Colonels men's basketball team
