= 2022–23 Texas A&M–Commerce Lions women's basketball team =

NCAA D I women's basketball season (Texas A&M-Commerce)

2022–23 Texas A&M–Commerce Lions women's basketball
- Conference: Southland Conference
- Record: 14–19 (10–8 Southland)
- Head coach: Jason Burton (9th season)
- Assistant coaches: Markeith Brown; Lexi Murphy
- Home arena: Texas A&M–Commerce Field House

2022–23 Southland Conference women's basketball standings
	Conf.				Overall
Team	W		L	PCT	W		L	PCT
Southeastern Louisiana †	14	–	4	.778	21	–	10	.677
Texas A&M–Corpus Christi	14	–	4	.778	19	–	12	.613
Lamar	12	–	6	.667	20	–	12	.625
Incarnate Word	10	–	8	.556	15	–	14	.517
Texas A&M–Commerce*	10	–	8	.556	14	–	19	.424
McNeese	8	–	10	.444	12	–	19	.387
New Orleans	7	–	11	.389	8	–	20	.286
Northwestern State	7	–	11	.389	11	–	18	.379
Houston Christian	6	–	12	.333	11	–	18	.379
Nicholls	2	–	16	.111	5	–	24	.172
† 2023 Southland tournament winner * ineligible for the 2023 NCAA tournament due to transition period As of March 18, 2023

The 2022–23 Texas A&M–Commerce Lions women's basketball team represented Texas A&M University–Commerce in the 2022–23 NCAA Division I women's basketball season. The Lions, led by ninth-year head coach Jason Burton, played their home games at Texas A&M–Commerce Field House in Commerce, Texas, as members of the Southland Conference.

This season marks Texas A&M–Commerce's first year of a four-year transition period from Division II to Division I. As a result, the Lions are not eligible for NCAA postseason play until 2026–27 season.

== Previous season ==
The Lions finished the 2021–22 season ranked 15th in the Division II Sports Information Directors' rankings and 18th in the Women's Basketball Coaches Association poll. They had a 27–5 record overall. The Lions had a 12–3 conference record in Lone Star Conference play for a second-place finish. They fell to West Texas A&M in the conference tournament finals. The Lions were selected to participate in the 2022 NCAA Division II women's basketball tournament. They had an 80–74 first-round win over Colorado School of Mines in the South Central regionals. Their season ended with a 67–69 second-round loss to Lubbock Christian.

=== Preseason polls ===
==== Southland Conference Poll ====
The Southland Conference released its preseason poll on October 25, 2022. Receiving one first place vote, the Lions were picked to finish fifth in the conference.

Predicted finish	Team	Votes (1st place)
1	Texas A&M–Corpus Christi	148 (20)
2	Houston Christian	131 (5)
3	Southeastern	122 (3)
4	Lamar	103
5	Texas A&M–Commerce Lions	101 (1)
6	McNeese	98
7	Incarnate Word	64
8	Northwestern State	61
9	New Orleans	47
10	Nicholls	25

==== Preseason All-Conference ====
In Texas A&M–Commerce's initial Southland Conference season, Dyani Robinson was selected to the Preseason All-Conference second team.

== Roster ==
2022–23 Texas A&M–Commerce Lions women's basketball team
Players
Coaches

Pos.	#	Name	Height	Year	Hometown
G	2	Nykale Cramer	5 ft 10 in (1.78 m)	So	Oklahoma City, OK
G	1	Dorian Norris	5 ft 11 in (1.8 m)	So	Lake Dallas, TX
G	2	Mia Deck	5 ft 6 in (1.68 m)	Jr	Frisco, TX
G	3	Nya Harmon	5 ft 7 in (1.7 m)	So	Dallas, TX
G	4	Jada Hood	5 ft 6 in (1.68 m)	Jr	Roseville, MN
F	10	DesiRay Kernal	6 ft 0 in (1.83 m)	Jr	Newton, KS
G	11	DaLonna Choice	5 ft 6 in (1.68 m)	Fr	Mesquite, TX
G	12	Dyani Robinson	5 ft 7 in (1.7 m)	Jr	Cypress, TX
G	14	Perina Leime	5 ft 9 in (1.75 m)	Fr	Melbourne, Australia
G/F	20	Olivia Russell	5 ft 11 in (1.8 m)	Jr	Auburn Hills, MI
F	21	Jasmine Payne	6 ft 0 in (1.83 m)	So	Montgomery, AL
F	23	Zaria Collins	5 ft 9 in (1.75 m)	Sr	Plano, TX
G	24	Asiyha Smith	5 ft 7 in (1.7 m)	So	Conway, AR
F	30	Jordyn Beaty	6 ft 0 in (1.83 m)	So	Woodville, TX
C	32	Symmone James	6 ft 2 in (1.88 m)	So	McKinney, TX
F	34	Laila Lawrence	6 ft 1 in (1.85 m)	So	Lewisville, TX

Head coach

- Jason Burton (Austin College)

Assistant coach(es)

- Gerald Ewing (East Texas A&M)
- Princess Davis (East Texas A&M)
- Brook Costley (Emporia State)

Legend

- (C) Team captain
- (S) Suspended
- (I) Ineligible
- (W) Walk-on
- Injured
- Current redshirt

Roster
Last update: August 20, 2024

== Schedule and results ==
Date time, TV	Rank^{#}	Opponent^{#}	Result	Record	Site (attendance) city, state
Non-conference exhibition season
November 2, 2022*; 5:30 p.m.		SAGU	W 107–40		The Field House; Commerce, TX
November 4, 2022*; 6:00 p.m.		Arlington Baptist	W 103–30		The Field House; Commerce, TX
Non-conference regular season
November 7, 2022*; 6:00 p.m., ESPN+		UNT–Dallas	W 96–51	1–0	The Field House (333); Commerce, TX
November 12, 2022*; 3:30 p.m., ESPN+		at UT Arlington	L 72–75	1–1	College Park Center (1,186); Arlington, TX
November 15, 2022*; 7:00 p.m., ESPN+		at Houston	L 55–71	1–2	Fertitta Center (615); Houston, TX
November 18, 2022*; 7:00 p.m., ESPN+		at SMU	L 57–86	1–3	Moody Coliseum (745); Dallas, TX
November 26, 2022*; 2:00 p.m., ESPN+		New Mexico	L 71–78	1–4	The Field House (234); Commerce, TX
December 1, 2022*; 1:00 p.m., ESPN+		at Southern Utah	L 56–71	1–5	America First Event Center (977); Cedar City, UT
December 3, 2022*; 3:00 p.m., ESPN+		at Utah Tech	L 62–82	1–6	Burns Arena (489); St. George, UT
December 7, 2022*; 6:00 p.m., ESPN+		Idaho	W 88–72	2–6	The Field House (379); Commerce, TX
December 11, 2022*; 5:00 p.m., SECN		at Mississippi State	L 53–88	2–7	Humphrey Coliseum (4,917); Starkville, MS
December 19, 2022*; 3:00 p.m., ESPN+		vs. Bowling Green; UTRGV South Padre Classic	L 61–90	2–8	South Padre Island Convention Centre (262); Padre Island, TX
December 20, 2022*; 3:00 p.m., ESPN+		vs. Boise State; UTRGV South Padre Classic	L 66–75	2–9	South Padre Island Convention Centre (136); Padre Island, TX
December 28, 2022*; 7:00 p.m., LHN		at Texas	L 53–96	2–10	Moody Center (4,589); Austin, TX
Southland Conference regular season
December 31, 2022; 2:00 p.m., ESPN+		at Incarnate Word	W 64–61	3–10 (1–0)	The Field House (312); Commerce, TX
January 5, 2023; 5:30 p.m., ESPN+		Nicholls	W 81–48	4–10 (2–0)	The Field House (211); Commerce, TX
January 7, 2023; 1:00 p.m., ESPN+		at McNeese	W 79–71	5–10 (3–0)	The Legacy Center (1,760); Lake Charles, LA
January 12, 2023; 5:00 p.m., ESPN+		at Houston Christian	W 65–62	6–10 (4–0)	Sharp Gymnasium (206); Houston, TX
January 14, 2023; 2:00 p.m., ESPN+		Lamar	W 57–52	7–10 (5–0)	The Field House (324); Commerce, TX
January 19, 2023; 5:00 p.m., ESPN+		at New Orleans	W 74–69	8–10 (6–0)	Lakefront Arena (381); New Orleans, LA
January 21, 2023; 1:00 p.m., ESPN+		at Southeastern Louisiana	L 42–46	8–11 (6–1)	University Center (466); Hammond, LA
January 26, 2023; 5:00 p.m., ESPN+		at Lamar	L 49–66	8–12 (6–2)	Montagne Center (1,313); Beaumont, TX
January 28, 2023; 2:00 p.m., ESPN+		Houston Christian	W 73–65	9–12 (7–2)	The Field House (384); Commerce, TX
February 2, 2023; 5:00 p.m.		at Nicholls	Game postponed until February 20 due to icy weather conditions in Texas		Stopher Gymnasium; Thibodaux, LA
February 4, 2023; 2:00 p.m., ESPN+		McNeese	L 67–75	9–13 (7–3)	The Field House (271); Commerce, TX
February 9, 2023; 5:30 p.m., ESPN+		Northwestern State	W 67–47	10–13 (8–3)	The Field House (277); Commerce, TX
February 11, 2023; 1:00 p.m., ESPN+		at Northwestern State	L 66–71	10–14 (8–4)	Prather Coliseum (905); Natchitoches, LA
February 16, 2023; 5:30 p.m., ESPN+		New Orleans	W 83–70	11–14 (9–4)	The Field House (217); Commerce, TX
February 18, 2023; 2:00 p.m., ESPN3		Southeastern Louisiana	L 55–66	11–15 (9–5)	The Field House (342); Commerce, TX
February 20, 2023; 5:00 p.m., ESPN+		at Nicholls	W 77–70	12–15 (10–5)	Stopher Gymnasium (219); Thibodaux, LA
February 23, 2023; 5:00 p.m., ESPN+		at Texas A&M–Corpus Christi	L 58–83	12–16 (10–6)	American Bank Center (1,132); Corpus Christi, TX
February 25, 2023; 2:00 p.m., ESPN3		at Incarnate Word	L 62–73	12–17 (10–7)	McDermott Center; San Antonio, TX
March 1, 2023; 5:30 p.m., ESPN+		Texas A&M–Corpus Christi	L 53–61	12–18 (10–8)	The Field House (382); Commerce, TX
2023 Jersey Mike's Subs Southland basketball tournament
March 6, 2023; 11:00 a.m., ESPN+	(5)	vs. (8) Northwestern State; First round	W 79–66	13–18	The Legacy Center; Lake Charles, LA
March 7, 2023; 11:00 a.m., ESPN+	(5)	vs. (4) Incarnate Word; Second round	W 65–62	14–18	The Legacy Center; Lake Charles, LA
March 8, 2023; 11:00 a.m., ESPN+	(5)	vs. (1) Southeastern Louisiana; Semifinals	L 58–60 ^{OT}	14–19	The Legacy Center; Lake Charles, LA
*Non-conference game. ^{#}Rankings from AP poll. (#) Tournament seedings in parentheses. All times are in Central.

== See also ==
- 2022–23 Texas A&M–Commerce Lions men's basketball team
