= 2022–23 Lamar Lady Cardinals basketball team =

Intercollegiate basketball season

2022–23 Lamar Lady Cardinals basketball
- Conference: Southland Conference
- Record: 20–12 (12–6 SLC)
- Head coach: Aqua Franklin (4th season)
- Assistant coaches: Bianca Smith (2nd season); Raymond Patche (1st season); Omar Sneed (1st season)
- Home arena: Montagne Center (Capacity: 10,080)

2022–23 Southland Conference women's basketball standings
	Conf.				Overall
Team	W		L	PCT	W		L	PCT
Southeastern Louisiana †	14	–	4	.778	21	–	10	.677
Texas A&M–Corpus Christi	14	–	4	.778	19	–	12	.613
Lamar	12	–	6	.667	20	–	12	.625
Incarnate Word	10	–	8	.556	15	–	14	.517
Texas A&M–Commerce*	10	–	8	.556	14	–	19	.424
McNeese	8	–	10	.444	12	–	19	.387
New Orleans	7	–	11	.389	8	–	20	.286
Northwestern State	7	–	11	.389	11	–	18	.379
Houston Christian	6	–	12	.333	11	–	18	.379
Nicholls	2	–	16	.111	5	–	24	.172
† 2023 Southland tournament winner * ineligible for the 2023 NCAA tournament due to transition period As of March 18, 2023

The 2022–23 Lamar Lady Cardinals basketball team represented Lamar University during the 2022–23 NCAA Division I women's basketball season. The Lady Cardinals, led by fourth year head coach Aqua Franklin, played their home games at the Montagne Center in Beaumont, Texas as members of the Southland Conference. The Lady Cardinals finished the 2022–23 season with an overall record of 20–12 and 12–6 in conference play. After defeating McNeese in the second round and Texas A&M–Corpus Christi in the semi–final round of the 2023 Southland Conference women's basketball tournament, Lamar's season ended losing to Southeastern Louisiana in tournament championship game. Lamar entered the tournament as third seed.

The Lady Cardinals returned to the Southland Conference following one year as members of the Western Athletic Conference. Lamar was one of four schools, all from Texas, that left the Southland Conference in July 2021 to join the WAC.

== Previous season ==
The Lady Cardinals finished the 2021–22 season with an overall record of 14–15 and 8–10 in conference play. After defeating New Mexico State in the opening round of the 2022 WAC women's basketball tournament, their season ended losing to Sam Houston State in a first round game. Lamar entered the tournament as seventh seed.

== Offseason ==
=== Incoming transfers ===
Lamar incoming transfers
Name	Number	Pos.	Height	Year	Hometown	Previous School
Anaya Bernard	33	G	5'10"	Junior	Mansfield, TX	Idaho State
Telishia Brown	RS	G	5'6"	Freshman (RS)		Legacy School of Sport Sciences / Blinn Junior College

=== Incoming recruits ===
Lamar Incoming Recruits
Name	Number	Pos.	Height	Year	Hometown	Previous School
Alyiah Craft	2	G	5'6"	Freshman	Huntsville, TX	Huntsville HS
R'Mani Taylor	30	G	5'6"	Freshman	Houston, TX	Shadow Creek HS

== Preseason polls ==
=== Southland Conference Poll ===
The Southland Conference released its preseason poll on October 25, 2022. Receiving 103 overall votes, the Lady Cardinals were picked to finish fourth in the conference.

Predicted finish	Team	Votes (1st place)
1	Texas A&M–Corpus Christi	148 (11)
2	Houston Christian	131 (5)
3	Southeastern	122 (3)
4	Lamar	103
5	Texas A&M–Commerce Lions	101 (1)
6	McNeese	98
7	Incarnate Word	64
8	Northwestern State	61
9	New Orleans	47
10	Nicholls	25

=== Preseason All Conference ===
Akasha Davis was selected to the Preseason All Conference second team.

== Roster ==
2022–23 Lamar Lady Cardinals women's basketball team
Players
Coaches

Pos.	#	Name	Height	Year	Previous school	Hometown
G	2	Alyiah Craft	5 ft 6 in (1.68 m)	Fr	Wagner HS	Huntsville, TX
G	3	Sabria Dean	5 ft 7 in (1.7 m)	Jr	Mineola HS	Mineola, TX
G	4	Brooklyn Mitchell	5 ft 7 in (1.7 m)	Sr	Ursuline Academy; Kansas	New Orleans, LA
G	10	Malay McQueen	5 ft 7 in (1.7 m)	Sr	Bowie HS	Arlington, TX
G	11	Portia Adams	5 ft 6 in (1.68 m)	So	Cedar Hill HS	Cedar Hill, TX
F	13	Taliah Hill	6 ft 0 in (1.83 m)	So	Martin HS	Arlington, TX
F	14	Emma Imevbore	6 ft 4 in (1.93 m)	So	King Henry; London Thunder U18	London, England
F	22	NJ Weems	6 ft 1 in (1.85 m)	Jr	DeLaSalle HS/Moberly Area CC	Minneapolis, MN
C	25	Bebe Galloway	5 ft 11 in (1.8 m)	Jr	Ball HS	Galveston, TX
C	30	R'Mani Taylor	5 ft 6 in (1.68 m)	Fr	Shadow Creek HS	Houston, TX
G/F	33	Anaya Bernard	5 ft 10 in (1.78 m)	So	Duncanville HS/Idaho State	Mansfield, TX
F/C	41	Akasha Davis	6 ft 2 in (1.88 m)	So	Wylie East HS	Dallas, TX

Head coach

- Aqua Franklin (Texas A&M)

Assistant coach(es)

- Bianca Smith (Colorado)
- Raymond Patche (Arizona State)
- Omar Sneed (San Jacinto/Memphis)

Legend

- (C) Team captain
- (S) Suspended
- (I) Ineligible
- (W) Walk-on
- Injured
- Current redshirt

Roster
Last update: November 21, 2022

== Schedule ==
Date time, TV	Rank^{#}	Opponent^{#}	Result	Record	High points	High rebounds	High assists	Site (attendance) city, state
Exhibition
November 5, 2022*; 1:00 pm		East Texas Baptist	W 69–43		29 – Adams	9 – Davis	4 – Tied	Montagne Center; Beaumont, TX
Non-Conference season
November 7, 2022*; 7:00 pm, ESPN+		at Baylor	L 50–88	0–1	13 – Davis	8 – Davis	3 – Tied	Ferrell Center (4,032); Waco, TX
November 11, 2022*; 7:00 pm, ESPN+		Jarvis Christian	W 78–55	1–1	25 – Dean	8 – Craft	5 – Tied	Montagne Center (804); Beaumont, TX
November 16, 2022*; 5:30 pm		at Prairie View A&M	W 66–63 ^{OT}	2–1	25 – Dean	15 – Imevbore	5 – McQueen	William J. Nicks Building (224); Prairie View, TX
November 25, 2022*; 5:00 pm		vs. Mississippi Valley State; Southern Mississippi Thanksgiving Tournament	W 85–49	3–1	17 – Imevbore	11 – Imevbore	8 – Adams	Reed Green Coliseum (838); Hattiesburg, MS
November 26, 2022*; 5:00 pm, ESPN+		at Southern Miss; Southern Mississippi Thanksgiving Tournament	L 48–56	3–2	12 – Adams	7 – Davis	3 – Tied	Reed Green Coliseum (829); Hattiesburg, MS
December 3, 2022*; 2:00 pm, ESPN+		UT Arlington	L 56–60	3–3	20 – Dean	10 – Imevbore	3 – Tied	Montagne Center (1,091); Beaumont, TX
December 6, 2022*; 7:00 pm, ESPN+		Loyola (New Orleans)	W 76–63	4–3	24 – Adams	8 – Davis	7 – Dean	Montagne Center (587); Beaumont, TX
December 8, 2022*; 7:00 pm, SECN		at No. 21 Arkansas	L 50–63	4–4	12 – Adams	7 – Tied	5 – Taylor	Bud Walton Arena (2,268); Fayetteville, AR
December 14, 2022*; 7:00 pm, SECN		at No. 11 LSU	L 42–88	4–5	15 – Dean	8 – Adams	0 – No assists recorded	Pete Maravich Assembly Center (5,654); Baton Rouge, LA
December 17, 2022*; 2:00 pm, ESPN+		Louisiana	W 65–50	5–5	18 – Davis	6 – Tied	6 – Adams	Montagne Center (901); Beaumont, TX
December 21, 2022*; 7:00 pm, ESPN+		Texas A&M University–Texarkana	W 60–51	6–5	25 – Davis	11 – Davis	5 – Tied	Montagne Center (804); Beaumont, TX
Southland Conference season
December 31, 2022; 1:00 pm, ESPN+		McNeese; Battle of the Border (Rivalry)	W 82–61	7–5 (1–0)	20 – Dean	7 – Davis	5 – Adams	Montagne Center (1,103); Beaumont, TX
January 5, 2023; 5:00 pm, ESPN+		at New Orleans	L 46–60	7–6 (1–1)	14 – Tied	5 – Tied	4 – Adams	Lakefront Arena; New Orleans, LA
January 7, 2023; 1:00 pm, ESPN+		at Southeastern Louisiana	W 57–47	8–6 (2–1)	14 – Tied	9 – Davis	4 – Dean	University Center (248); Hammond, LA
January 12, 2023; 5:00 pm, ESPN+		Nicholls	L 74–80 ^{OT}	8–7 (2–2)	26 – Dean	11 – Imevbore	6 – Weems	Montagne Center (1,127); Beaumont, TX
January 14, 2023; 2:00 pm, ESPN+		at Texas A&M–Commerce	L 52–57	8–8 (2–3)	18 – Dean	7 – Imevbore	2 – Tied	Texas A&M–Commerce Field House; Commerce, TX
January 19, 2023; 5:00 pm, ESPN+		Texas A&M–Corpus Christi	L 59–61	8–9 (2–4)	17 – Adams	8 – Davis	5 – Dean	Montagne Center (1,023); Beaumont, TX
January 21, 2023; 3:00 pm, ESPN+		Incarnate Word	W 72–52	9–9 (3–4)	26 – Davis	8 – Tied	6 – Tied	Montagne Center (1,243); Beaumont, TX
January 26, 2023; 5:00 pm, ESPN+		Texas A&M–Commerce	W 66–49	10–9 (4–4)	16 – Dean	9 – Adams	7 – Adams	Montagne Center (1,313); Beaumont, TX
January 28, 2023; 1:00 pm, ESPN+		at Northwestern State	L 52–54	10–10 (4–5)	15 – Davis	11 – Davis	2 – Tied	Prather Coliseum (891); Natchitoches, LA
February 2, 2023; 2:00 pm, ESPN+		at McNeese; Battle of the Border (Rivalry)	W 79–48	11–10 (5–5)	20 – Davis	7 – Tied	4 – Tied	The Legacy Center (1,584); Lake Charles, LA0
February 4, 2023; 3:00 pm, ESPN+		Northwestern State	W 75–57	12–10 (6–5)	20 – Davis	14 – Davis	7 – Dean	Montagne Center (1,206); Beaumont, TX
February 9, 2023; 5:30 pm, ESPN+		at Incarnate Word	W 74–67	13–10 (7–5)	23 – Davis	12 – Davis	3 – Tied	McDermott Center; San Antonio, TX
February 11, 2023; 1:00 pm, ESPN+		at Texas A&M–Corpus Christi	W 73–68	14–10 (8–5)	17 – Tied	10 – Davis	5 – Dean	American Bank Center (1,266); Corpus Christi, TX
February 16, 2023; 5:00 pm, ESPN+		Houston Christian	W 71–63	15–10 (9–5)	32 – Adams	10 – Imevbore	4 – Taylor	Montagne Center (1,169); Beaumont, TX
February 18, 2023; 2:00 pm, ESPN+		at Houston Christian	W 55–53	16–10 (10–5)	16 – Davis	14 – Davis	3 – Taylor	Sharp Gym (420); Houston, TX
February 23, 2023; 5:00 pm, ESPN+		Southeastern Louisiana	W 66–54	17–10 (11–5)	22 – Davis	16 – Davis	3 – Tied	Montagne Center (1,421); Beaumont, TX
February 25, 2023; 3:00 pm, ESPN+		New Orleans	L 61–62	17–11 (11–6)	21 – Adams	7 – Tied	5 – Adams	Montagne Center (1,458); Beaumont, TX
March 1, 2023; 5:00 pm, ESPN+		at Nicholls	W 70–57	18–11 (12–6)	21 – Tied	17 – Davis	4 – Dean	Stopher Gymnasium (344); Thibodaux, LA
2023 Jersey Mike's Subs Southland Conference Tournament
March 7, 2023; 1:30 pm, ESPN+	(3)	at (6) McNeese; Second round	W 80–75 ^{OT}	19–11	25 – Davis	14 – Davis	4 – Tied	The Legacy Center (453); Lake Charles, LA
March 8, 2023; 1:30 pm, ESPN+	(3)	vs. (2) Texas A&M–Corpus Christi; Semi-finals	W 65–53	20–11	17 – Tied	17 – Davis	4 – Taylor	The Legacy Center; Lake Charles, LA
March 9, 2023; 4:00 pm, ESPNU	(3)	vs. (1) Southeastern Louisiana; Championship	L 57–66	20–12	20 – Adams	13 – Davis	3 – Tied	The Legacy Center (606); Lake Charles, LA
*Non-conference game. ^{#}Rankings from AP Poll. (#) Tournament seedings in parentheses. All times are in Central Time.

== Conference awards and honors ==
=== All conference ===
Akasha Davis was named as a first team member of the 2022-23 Southland Conference All conference team.

=== All-Academic team ===
Akasha Davis was named as the Southland Conference Women’s Basketball Student-Athlete of the Year. She was also named as a first team member of the All-Academic first team. Sabria Dean was named as a member of the Southland Conference All-Academic second team.

=== Weekly awards ===
Akasha Davis and Portia Adams were both named as player of the week during the season. Davis garnered the honor three times. Adams was named one time.

Weekly honors
Honors	Player	Position	Date Awarded	Ref.
SLC Women's Basketball Player of the Week	Akasha Davis	C	January 2, 2023	
SLC Women's Basketball Player of the Week	Akasha Davis	C	February 13, 2023	
SLC Women's Basketball Player of the Week	Portia Adams	G	February 20, 2023	
SLC Women's Basketball Player of the Week	Akasha Davis	C	March 2, 2023	

== See also ==
2022–23 Lamar Cardinals basketball team
