= 2022–23 Oklahoma Sooners women's basketball team =

Women's college basketball season

2022–23 Oklahoma Sooners women's basketball

Big 12 regular season co-champions

NCAA tournament, Second Round
- Conference: Big 12

Ranking
- Coaches: No. 17
- AP: No. 16
- Record: 26–7 (14–4 Big 12)
- Head coach: Jennie Baranczyk (2nd season)
- Assistant coaches: Amy Wright; Michael Neal; Chantel Osahor
- Home arena: Lloyd Noble Center

2022–23 Big 12 Conference women's basketball standings
	Conf.				Overall
Team	W		L	PCT	W		L	PCT
No. 15 Texas	14	–	4	.778	26	–	10	.722
No. 16 Oklahoma	14	–	4	.778	26	–	7	.788
No. 17 Iowa State†	11	–	7	.611	22	–	10	.688
Oklahoma State	10	–	8	.556	21	–	12	.636
West Virginia	10	–	8	.556	19	–	12	.613
Baylor	10	–	8	.556	20	–	13	.606
Kansas	9	–	9	.500	22	–	11	.667
Texas Tech	6	–	12	.333	20	–	15	.571
Kansas State	5	–	13	.278	19	–	16	.543
TCU	1	–	17	.056	8	–	23	.258
† 2023 Big 12 Tournament winner As of March 24, 2023; Rankings from AP poll

The 2022–23 Oklahoma Sooners women's basketball team represented the University of Oklahoma in the 2022–23 NCAA Division I women's basketball season. The Sooners were led by second year head coach Jennie Baranczyk. The team played its home games at the Lloyd Noble Center in Norman, Oklahoma as a member of the Big 12 Conference.

== Previous season ==
The Sooners finished the previous season 25–9, 12–6 in Big 12 play, to finish in fourth place. At the Big 12 Tournament Sooners beat number 5 seed Kansas at the quarterfinal 80–68. In the semifinal, they lost against the number 1 seed Baylor - whom they beat twice in the Big 12 regular season - 76–91. Oklahoma entered the NCAA tournament as a 4-seed where they faced off against 13-seed IUPUI. The Sooners would go on to defeat the Jaguars 78–72, advancing Oklahoma to the round of 32. In the second round they lost to the number 5 seeded Notre Dame 64–108, and finished their season. The season ending rankings the Sooners placed 22nd (AP) and 21st (Coaches) place, marking the first time since 2017 that the Sooners have been ranked in the season ending polls.

== Offseason ==
=== Departures ===
Departures
Name	Number	Pos.	Height	Year	Hometown	Reason for departure	Source
Gabby Gregory	12	G	6'0"	Junior	Tulsa, OK	Transferred to Kansas State	
Bre'Yon White	14	F	5'11"	Freshman	Pearland, TX	Transferred to TCU	
Nydia Lampkin	21	F	6'3"	Senior	Palm Bay, FL	Graduated	

=== Additions ===
Incoming transfers
Name	Number	Pos.	Height	Year	Hometown	Previous school	Note	Source
Aubrey Joens	20	G	5'9"	Sophomore	Iowa City, IA	Iowa State		
Payton Verhulst	12	G	6'1"	Freshman	De Soto, KS	Louisville	Eligible for the 2023-24 season	

=== Recruits ===
==== 2022 recruiting class ====
College recruiting
Name	Hometown	School	Height	Weight	Commit date
Beatrice Culliton; C	Overland Park, KS	Saint Thomas Aquinas HS	6 ft 3 in (1.91 m)	N/A	Jun 16, 2021
Beatrice Culliton; C	Recruit ratings: ESPN: (91)				
Kiersten Johnson; F	Carrollton, TX	Duncanville HS	6 ft 3 in (1.91 m)	N/A	Nov 1, 2021
Kiersten Johnson; F	Recruit ratings: ESPN: (90)				
Kayla Cooper; G	Plano, TX	Plano East HS	5 ft 8 in (1.73 m)	N/A	Jun 4, 2021
Kayla Cooper; G	Recruit ratings: No ratings found				
Reyna Scott; G	New York, NY	Nazareth Regional HS	5 ft 9 in (1.75 m)	N/A	Nov 5, 2021
Reyna Scott; G	Recruit ratings: No ratings found				
Overall recruit ranking:
Note: In many cases, Scout, Rivals, 247Sports, On3, and ESPN may conflict in their listings of height and weight.; In these cases, the average was taken. ESPN grades are on a 100-point scale.; Sources: "2022 Player Commits". ESPN. Archived from the original on January 28, 2023.

==== 2023 Recruiting Class ====
College recruiting (2023)
Name	Hometown	School	Height	Weight	Commit date
Sahara Williams; W	Waterloo, IA	West High School	5 ft 10 in (1.78 m)	N/A	May 17, 2022
Sahara Williams; W	Recruit ratings: ESPN: (96)				
Landry Allen; C	Tuttle, OK	Tuttle High School	6 ft 3 in (1.91 m)	N/A	Jun 26, 2021
Landry Allen; C	Recruit ratings: No ratings found				
Overall recruiting rankings:
Note: In many cases, Scout, Rivals, 247Sports, and ESPN may conflict in their listings of height and weight.; In these cases, the average was taken. ESPN grades are on a 100-point scale.; Sources: "2023 Player Commits". ESPN.com.

== Roster ==
2022–23 Oklahoma Sooners women's basketball team
Players
Coaches

Pos.	#	Name	Height	Year	Previous school	Hometown
C	0	Beatrice Culliton	6 ft 3 in (1.91 m)	Fr	Saint Thomas Aquinas HS	Overland Park, KS
G	1	Nevaeh Tot	5 ft 3 in (1.6 m)	Jr	John Paul II HS	Columbus, OH
G	2	Reyna Scott	5 ft 10 in (1.78 m)	Fr	Nazareth Regional HS	New York, NY
G	4	Kennady Tucker	5 ft 10 in (1.78 m)	Sr	North Little Rock HS; North Carolina	Little Rock, AR
F	5	Kiersten Johnson	6 ft 4 in (1.93 m)	Fr	Duncanville HS	Carrollton, TX
G	10	Kelbie Washington	5 ft 7 in (1.7 m)	So	Norman HS	Norman, OK
G	11	Kayla Cooper	5 ft 9 in (1.75 m)	Fr	Plano East Senior HS	Plano, TX
G	12	Payton Verhulst (I)	6 ft 1 in (1.85 m)	So	Bishop Miege HS	De Soto, KS
F	13	Jordan Moser	6 ft 1 in (1.85 m)	Sr	Loyola Academy; Loyola–Chicago	Norman, OK
G	20	Aubrey Joens	5 ft 9 in (1.75 m)	Jr	Iowa City HS; Iowa State	Iowa City, IA
G	22	Ana Llanusa	6 ft 0 in (1.83 m)	RS Sr	Choctaw HS	Choctaw, OK
G	23	Kaley Perkins	6 ft 0 in (1.83 m)	So	Langham Creek HS	Houston, TX
G	24	Skylar Vann	6 ft 0 in (1.83 m)	Jr	Deer Creek HS	Edmond, OK
G/F	25	Madi Williams	6 ft 0 in (1.83 m)	RS Sr	Trinity Valley School	Fort Worth, TX
G	30	Taylor Robertson	6 ft 0 in (1.83 m)	RS Sr	McPherson HS	McPherson, KS
C	33	Emma Svoboda	6 ft 3 in (1.91 m)	So	La Quinta	La Quinta, CA
F	34	Liz Scott	6 ft 2 in (1.88 m)	Sr	Klein Oak HS	Tomball, TX

Head coach

- Jennie Baranczyk (Iowa)

Assistant coach(es)

- Amy Wright (Arkansas)
- Michael Neal (Oklahoma)
- Chantel Osahor (Washington)

Legend

- (C) Team captain
- (S) Suspended
- (I) Ineligible
- (W) Walk-on
- Injured
- Current redshirt

Roster
Last update: January 28, 2023

== Schedule ==
Date time, TV	Rank^{#}	Opponent^{#}	Result	Record	High points	High rebounds	High assists	Site (attendance) city, state
Exhibition
November 3, 2022*; 6:00 pm, ESPN+	No. 15	Emporia State	W 90–67	–	15 – Tot	8 – Johnson	4 – Tot	Lloyd Noble Center (1,094); Norman, OK
Non-conference regular season (10-1)
November 7, 2022*; 4:00 pm, ESPN+	No. 15	Oral Roberts	W 105–94	1–0	19 – Williams	8 – Vann	5 – R. Scott	Lloyd Noble Center (2,017); Norman, OK
November 11, 2022*; 10:30 am, ESPN+	No. 15	SMU	W 97–74	2–0	25 – Williams	7 – Vann	7 – Tot	Lloyd Noble Center (5,127); Norman, OK
November 15, 2022*; 3:00 pm, BYUtv	No. 16	at BYU	W 77–66	3–0	21 – Williams	9 – L. Scott	5 – Tied	Marriott Center (568); Provo, UT
November 16, 2022*; 8:00 pm, P12N	No. 16	at No. 25 Utah	L 78–124	3–1	15 – R. Scott	5 – Tied	4 – R. Scott	Jon M. Huntsman Center (2,521); Salt Lake City, UT
November 20, 2022*; 3:30 pm, ESPN+	No. 16	vs. UT Arlington; Maggie Dixon Classic	W 89–80	4–1	21 – Robertson	12 – Vann	6 – Tot	Schollmaier Arena (1,850); Fort Worth, TX
November 22, 2022*; 7:30 pm, ESPN+		at Arkansas State	W 95–70	5–1	14 – Tied	7 – L. Scott	5 – Tot	First National Bank Arena (3,686); Jonesboro, AR
November 30, 2022*; 6:00 pm, ESPN+		Northwestern State	W 88–45	6–1	16 – Williams	12 – Vann	4 – Vann	Lloyd Noble Center (2,198); Norman, OK
December 4, 2022*; 2:00 pm, ESPN+		Ole Miss	W 69–59	7–1	13 – Tot	8 – Williams	4 – Tot	Lloyd Noble Center (3,285); Norman, OK
December 11, 2022*; 12:00 pm, ESPN+	No. 23	Robert Morris	W 94–65	8–1	16 – L. Scott	9 – L. Scott	4 – Tot	Lloyd Noble Center (2,589); Norman, OK
December 18, 2022*; 2:00 pm, ESPN+	No. 24	Southern	W 76–50	9–1	14 – Tied	10 – L. Scott	4 – Williams	Lloyd Noble Center (3,222); Norman, OK
December 21, 2022*; 8:30 pm, ESPN2	No. 23	vs. Florida; Jumpman Invitational	W 95–79	10–1	22 – Williams	11 – Williams	5 – Llanusa	Spectrum Center (19,236); Charlotte, NC
Big 12 regular season (14-4)
December 31, 2022; 1:00 pm, ESPN+	No. 20	at West Virginia	W 98–77	11–1 (1–0)	28 – Llanusa	10 – Vann	5 – Tied	WVU Coliseum (2,280); Morgantown, WV
January 3, 2023; 6:00 pm, ESPN+	No. 17	No. 23 Baylor	L 70–81	11–2 (1–1)	24 – Llanusa	10 – Vann	4 – Williams	Lloyd Noble Center (3,196); Norman, OK
January 8, 2023; 2:00 pm, ESPN2	No. 17	No. 11 Iowa State	W 82–79	12–2 (2–1)	23 – Llanusa	9 – Williams	3 – Tied	Lloyd Noble Center (3,349); Norman, OK
January 11, 2023; 7:00 pm, ESPN+	No. 19	at Texas Tech	W 89–79	13–2 (3–1)	20 – Llanusa	11 – Vann	6 – Tied	United Supermarkets Arena (4,098); Lubbock, TX
January 14, 2023; 2:00 pm, ESPN+	No. 19	No. 23 Kansas	W 80–74	14–2 (4–1)	20 – Williams	15 – L. Scott	7 – Tot	Lloyd Noble Center (8,445); Norman, OK
January 18, 2023; 6:30 pm, ESPN+	No. 15	at TCU	W 93–66	15–2 (5–1)	19 – Williams	11 – L. Scott	7 – Tot	Schollmaier Arena; Fort Worth, TX
January 21, 2023; 6:00 pm, ESPN+	No. 15	Oklahoma State; Bedlam Series	W 97–93	16–2 (6–1)	26 – Williams	8 – L. Scott	4 – Llanusa	Lloyd Noble Center (9,580); Norman, OK
January 25, 2023; 7:00 pm, LHN	No. 14	at Texas	L 58–78	16–3 (6–2)	13 – Vann	7 – Tied	4 – Llanusa	Moody Center (6,623); Austin, TX
January 28, 2023; 3:00 pm, ESPN+	No. 14	at No. 18 Iowa State	L 78–86	16–4 (6–3)	25 – Robertson	7 – Tied	4 – Robertson	Hilton Coliseum (11,568); Ames, IA
January 31, 2023; 6:00 pm, ESPN+	No. 20	TCU	W 101–78	17–4 (7–3)	26 – Williams	7 – L. Scott	4 – Williams	Lloyd Noble Center (2,736); Norman, OK
February 4, 2023; 2:00 pm, ESPN+	No. 20	West Virginia	W 93–68	18–4 (8–3)	16 – Vann	8 – Vann	5 – Joens	Lloyd Noble Center (4,179); Norman, OK
February 7, 2023; 7:00 pm, ESPN+	No. 16	at Baylor	W 98–92 ^{OT}	19–4 (9–3)	20 – Tied	10 – Williams	5 – Tied	Ferrell Center (4,396); Waco, TX
February 12, 2023; 1:00 pm, ESPNU	No. 16	at Kansas State	W 85–68	20–4 (10–3)	20 – L. Scott	8 – Scott	8 – Tot	Bramlage Coliseum (4,138); Manhattan, KS
February 15, 2023; 6:00 pm, ESPN+	No. 15	Texas Tech	W 84–57	21–4 (11–3)	23 – Joens	11 – Joens	10 – Culliton	Lloyd Noble Center (2,931); Norman, OK
February 19, 2023; 2:00 pm, ESPN+	No. 15	at Kansas	W 86–80	22–4 (12–3)	23 – Williams	10 – L. Scott	4 – Tied	Allen Fieldhouse (3,729); Lawrence, KS
February 25, 2023; 1:00 pm, ESPN+	No. 13	No. 19 Texas	L 45–67	22–5 (12–4)	13 – L. Scott	9 – L. Scott	2 – Tucker	Lloyd Noble Center (10,127); Norman, OK
March 1, 2023; 6:00 pm, ESPN+	No. 16	Kansas State	W 90–86 ^{OT}	23–5 (13–4)	23 – Vann	9 – L. Scott	6 – Llanusa	Lloyd Noble Center (3,251); Norman, OK
March 4, 2023; 2:00 pm, ESPN+	No. 16	at Oklahoma State; Bedlam Series	W 80–71	24–5 (14–4)	15 – Robertson	11 – Vann	6 – Tied	Gallagher-Iba Arena (6,585); Stillwater, OK
Big 12 Women's Tournament (1-1)
March 10, 2023; 5:00 pm, ESPN+	(2) No. 14	vs. (10) TCU; Quarterfinals	W 77–76	25–5	21 – Vann	7 – Culliton	4 – Tied	Municipal Auditorium; Kansas City, MO
March 11, 2023; 2:30 pm, ESPN+	(2) No. 14	vs. (3) Iowa State; Semifinals	L 72–82	25–6	19 – Williams	8 – Tied	7 – Robertson	Municipal Auditorium (5,937); Kansas City, MO
NCAA Women's Tournament (0-0)
March 18, 2023*; 8:00 pm, ESPNU	(5 G1) No. 16	vs. (12 G1) Portland; First Round	W 85–63	26–6	14 – Tied	12 – L. Scott	5 – Tucker	Pauley Pavilion; Los Angeles, CA
March 20, 2023*; 9:00 p.m., ESPN2	(5 G1) No. 16	at (4 G1) No. 14 UCLA; Second Round	L 73–82	26–7	24 – Williams	6 – Vann	6 – Williams	Pauley Pavilion (3,872); Los Angeles, CA
*Non-conference game. ^{#}Rankings from AP Poll. (#) Tournament seedings in parentheses. G1=Greenville 1. All times are in Central Time.
