= Donna Finnie =

American basketball coach

Biographical details
- Education: Heriot-Watt University

Coaching career (HC unless noted)
- 2010–13: Houston Baptist (assistant)
- 2013–2025: Houston Baptist / Houston Christian

Head coaching record
- Overall: 123–214 (.365)

Donna Finnie is a Scottish basketball coach who was most recently the head coach of the Houston Christian Huskies women's basketball team, a position she held from 2013-2025. She is the first ever non-American head coach in NCAA basketball history. In 2022, she guided the Huskies to their first regular season conference championship in school history. On March 11, 2025, it was announced by HCU Director of Athletics Steve Moniaci that Finnie's contract had not been renewed, effectively ending her tenure with Houston Christian.

== Career head coaching record ==
Record table
Season	Team	Overall	Conference	Standing	Postseason
Houston Baptist / Houston Christian (Southland Conference) (2013–2025)
2013–14	Houston Baptist	12–17	8–10		
2014–15	Houston Baptist	15–18	6–12		
2015–16	Houston Baptist	14–15	9–9		
2016–17	Houston Baptist	6–22	4–14		
2017–18	Houston Baptist	10–18	6–12		
2018–19	Houston Baptist	9–19	4–14		
2019–20	Houston Baptist	8–21	4–16		
2020–21	Houston Baptist	11–11	6–7		
2021–22	Houston Baptist	15–9	11–2	1st	WNIT First Round
2022–23	Houston Christian	11–18	6–12	9th	
2023–24	Houston Christian	6–23	1–17	10th	
2024–25	Houston Christian	6–23	3–17	12th	
Houston Baptist / Christian:		123–214 (.365)	68–142 (.324)		
Total:		123–214 (.365)			
National champion Postseason invitational champion Conference regular season champion Conference regular season and conference tournament champion Division regular season champion Division regular season and conference tournament champion Conference tournament champion
