= 2022–23 Baylor Bears women's basketball team =

American college basketball season

2022–23 Baylor Bears women's basketball

NCAA tournament, Second Round
- Conference: Big 12 Conference
- Record: 20–13 (10–8 Big 12)
- Head coach: Nicki Collen (2nd season)
- Assistant coaches: Tari Cummings (2nd season); Tony Greene (2nd season); Chloe Pavlech (2nd season)
- Home arena: Ferrell Center

2022–23 Big 12 Conference women's basketball standings
	Conf.				Overall
Team	W		L	PCT	W		L	PCT
No. 15 Texas	14	–	4	.778	26	–	10	.722
No. 16 Oklahoma	14	–	4	.778	26	–	7	.788
No. 17 Iowa State†	11	–	7	.611	22	–	10	.688
Oklahoma State	10	–	8	.556	21	–	12	.636
West Virginia	10	–	8	.556	19	–	12	.613
Baylor	10	–	8	.556	20	–	13	.606
Kansas	9	–	9	.500	22	–	11	.667
Texas Tech	6	–	12	.333	20	–	15	.571
Kansas State	5	–	13	.278	19	–	16	.543
TCU	1	–	17	.056	8	–	23	.258
† 2023 Big 12 Tournament winner As of March 24, 2023; Rankings from AP poll

The 2022–23 Baylor Bears women's basketball team represented Baylor University in the 2022–23 NCAA Division I women's basketball season. The Bears, members of the Big 12 Conference, played their home games at the Ferrell Center in Waco, Texas and were led by second-year head coach Nicki Collen.

== Previous season ==
The Lady Bears finished the 2021–22 season with a record of 28–7, 15–3 in Big 12 play, to win the Big 12 regular season title. They defeated Oklahoma State and Oklahoma in the quarterfinals and semifinals to advanced to the championship game of the Big 12 women's tournament where they lost to Texas. They received an at-large bid to the NCAA tournament in the Wichita Region, they defeated Hawaii in the first round before getting upset by South Dakota in the second round.

== Offseason ==
=== Departures ===
Baylor departures
Name	Number	Pos.	Height	Year	Hometown	Reason for departure
NaLyssa Smith	1	F	6'2"	Junior	Converse, TX	Declare for 2022 WNBA draft; selected 2nd overall by Indiana Fever
Jordan Lewis	3	G	5'7"	Graduate student	Windermere, FL	Graduated/2022 WNBA draft; selected 24th overall by Connecticut Sun
Queen Egbo	4	C	6'3"	Senior	Houston, TX	Graduated/2022 WNBA draft; selected 10th overall by Indiana Fever
Kamaria McDaniel	22	G	5'10"	Graduate student	Inkster, MI	Graduate transferred to Michigan State

=== Incoming ===
Baylor incoming transfers
Name	Num	Pos.	Height	Year	Hometown	Previous school
Jana Van Gytenbeek	4	G	5'7"	Junior	Greenwood Village, CO	Stanford
Erika Porter	20	F	6'3"	Junior	West Windsor, NJ	Illinois
Catarina Ferreira	30	F	6'1"	Junior	São Paulo, Brazil	Eastern Arizona College
Aijha Blackwell	33	G	6'0"	Senior	Berkeley, MO	Missouri
Dre'una Edwards	44	F	6'2"	(redshirt) Senior	Compton, CA	Kentucky

==== Recruiting ====
College recruiting information
Name	Hometown	School	Height	Weight	Commit date
Darianna Littlepage-Buggs; W	Oklahoma City, OK	Classen High School	6 ft 1 in (1.85 m)	N/A	
Darianna Littlepage-Buggs; W	Recruit ratings: ESPN: (96)				
Ysabella Fontleroy; W	Springfield, MO	Kickapoo High School	6 ft 1 in (1.85 m)	N/A	
Ysabella Fontleroy; W	Recruit ratings: ESPN: (95)				
Kyla Abraham; P	Smithfield, VA	Smithfield High School	6 ft 4 in (1.93 m)	N/A	
Kyla Abraham; P	Recruit ratings: ESPN: (93)				
Overall recruit ranking:
Note: In many cases, Scout, Rivals, 247Sports, On3, and ESPN may conflict in their listings of height and weight.; In these cases, the average was taken. ESPN grades are on a 100-point scale.; Sources: "2022 Player Commits". ESPN. Archived from the original on February 6, 2023.

==== Recruiting class of 2023 ====
College recruiting information (2023)
Name	Hometown	School	Height	Weight	Commit date
Letycia Vasconcelos; P	Montverde, FL	Montverde Academy	6 ft 7 in (2.01 m)	N/A	
Letycia Vasconcelos; P	Recruit ratings: ESPN: (95)				
Overall recruit ranking:
Note: In many cases, Scout, Rivals, 247Sports, On3, and ESPN may conflict in their listings of height and weight.; In these cases, the average was taken. ESPN grades are on a 100-point scale.; Sources: "2023 Player Commits". ESPN. Archived from the original on February 6, 2023.

== Roster ==
2022–23 Baylor Bears women's basketball team
Players
Coaches

Pos.	#	Name	Height	Year	Previous school	Hometown
G	4	Jana Van Gytenbeek	5 ft 7 in (1.7 m)	Jr	Stanford	Greenwood Village, CO
G/F	5	Darianna Littlepage-Buggs	6 ft 1 in (1.85 m)	Fr	Classen HS	Edmond, OK
G	10	Jaden Owens	5 ft 8 in (1.73 m)	Sr	UCLA	Plano, TX
F	12	Kyla Abraham	6 ft 3 in (1.91 m)	Fr	Smithfield HS	Carrollton, VA
F	20	Erika Porter	6 ft 0 in (1.83 m)	Jr	Illinois	West Windsor, NJ
G	21	Ja'Mee Asberry	5 ft 5 in (1.65 m)	GS	Oklahoma State	Tulsa, OK
G/F	22	Bella Fontleroy	6 ft 0 in (1.83 m)	Fr	Kickapoo HS	Springfield, MO
G	24	Sarah Andrews	5 ft 6 in (1.68 m)	Jr	MacArthur HS	Irving, TX
F	25	Kendra Gillispie	6 ft 2 in (1.88 m)	So	Harding Charter Prep HS	Norman, OK
G	30	Catarina Ferreira	6 ft 0 in (1.83 m)	Jr	Eastern Arizona College	São Paulo, Brazil
G/F	33	Aijha Blackwell	6 ft 0 in (1.83 m)	Sr	Missouri	Berkeley, MO
F	44	Dre'una Edwards	6 ft 0 in (1.83 m)	RS Sr	Kentucky	Compton, CA
F	51	Caitlin Bickle	6 ft 0 in (1.83 m)	GS	Cactus Shadows HS	Cave Creek, AZ

Head coach

- Nicki Collen (Marquette)

Assistant coach(es)

- Tari Cummings (Oklahoma State)
- Tony Greene (Langston)
- Chloe Pavlech (Maryland)

Legend

- (C) Team captain
- (S) Suspended
- (I) Ineligible
- (W) Walk-on
- Injured
- Current redshirt

Roster
Last update: February 13, 2024

== Schedule and results ==
Date time, TV	Rank^{#}	Opponent^{#}	Result	Record	High points	High rebounds	High assists	Site (attendance) city, state
Exhibition
November 3, 2022*; 7:00 p.m.	No. 18	Southwest Baptist	W 97–40		16 – Blackwell	–	–	Ferrell Center; Waco, TX
Non-conference regular season
November 7, 2022*; 7:00 p.m., ESPN+	No. 18	Lamar	W 88–50	1–0	17 – Tied	8 – Fontleroy	12 – Owens	Ferrell Center (4,032); Waco, TX
November 10, 2022*; 7:00 p.m., ESPN+	No. 18	Incarnate Word	W 71–42	2–0	23 – Blackwell	11 – Blackwell	4 – Tied	Ferrell Center (3,809); Waco, TX
November 15, 2022*; 7:00 p.m., ESPN+	No. 17	SMU	W 58–55	3–0	13 – Andrews	14 – Littlepage-Buggs	7 – Owens	Ferrell Center (3,839); Waco, TX
November 20, 2022*; 2:00 p.m., ESPN+	No. 17	No. 19 Maryland	L 68–73	3–1	25 – Andrews	12 – Littlepage-Buggs	6 – Tied	Ferrell Center (4,500); Waco, TX
November 25, 2022*; 10:00 a.m., FloHoops	No. 21	vs. Saint Louis; Gulf Coast Showcase Quarterfinals	W 92–58	4–1	16 – Andrews	14 – Littlepage-Buggs	10 – Owens	Hertz Arena (213); Fort Myers, FL
November 26, 2022*; 4:00 p.m., FloHoops	No. 21	vs. No. 23 Villanova; Gulf Coast Showcase Semifinals	W 75–70	5–1	18 – Bickle	12 – Bickle	2 – Owens	Hertz Arena (314); Fort Myers, FL
November 27, 2022*; 6:30 p.m., FloHoops	No. 21	vs. No. 22 Michigan; Gulf Coast Showcase finals	L 75–84	5–2	18 – Bickle	7 – Tied	6 – Asberry	Hertz Arena (313); Fort Myers, FL
December 4, 2022*; 2:00 p.m., ESPN+	No. 21	Houston Christian	W 79–35	6–2	17 – Fontleroy	11 – Fontleroy	6 – Owens	Ferrell Center (3,935); Waco, TX
December 7, 2022*; 7:00 p.m., ESPN+	No. 19	UT Arlington	W 91–36	7–2	20 – Andrews	10 – Littlepage-Buggs	7 – Bickle	Ferrell Center (3,800); Waco, TX
December 15, 2022*; 11:00 a.m., ESPN+	No. 18	Tennessee State	W 93–27	8–2	30 – Littlepage-Buggs	11 – Littlepage-Buggs	6 – Tied	Ferrell Center (8,700); Waco, TX
December 18, 2022*; 6:30 p.m., ESPN2	No. 18	vs. No. 20 Arizona; Pac-12 Coast-to-Coast Challenge	L 54–75	8–3	15 – Owens	11 – Bickle	8 – Owens	American Airlines Center; Dallas, TX
December 21, 2022*; 3:00 p.m., ESPN+	No. 24	Long Beach State	W 73–52	9–3	17 – Bickle	12 – Andrews	14 – Andrews	Ferrell Center (3,909); Waco, TX
Big 12 regular season
December 31, 2022; 2:00 p.m., ESPN+	No. 23	TCU	W 64–42	10–3 (1–0)	19 – Bickle	7 – Tied	5 – Owens	Ferrell Center (4,385); Waco, TX
January 3, 2023; 6:00 p.m., ESPN+	No. 23	at No. 17 Oklahoma	W 81–70	11–3 (2–0)	30 – Andrews	10 – Bickle	6 – Owens	Lloyd Noble Center (3,196); Norman, OK
January 7, 2023; 4:00 p.m., ESPN+	No. 23	at No. 21 Kansas	W 75–62	12–3 (3–0)	27 – Andrews	13 – Littlepage-Buggs	4 – Andrews	Allen Fieldhouse (3,528); Lawrence, KS
January 11, 2023; 7:00 p.m., ESPN+	No. 18	Oklahoma State	L 65–70	12–4 (3–1)	19 – Asberry	12 – Bickle	7 – Owens	Ferrell Center (3,972); Waco, TX
January 15, 2023; 2:00 p.m., ESPNU	No. 18	at West Virginia	L 65–74	12–5 (3–2)	24 – Andrews	15 – Littlepage-Buggs	4 – Andrews	WVU Coliseum (2,702); Morgantown, WV
January 18, 2023; 7:00 p.m., ESPN+		Kansas State	W 69–48	13–5 (4–2)	19 – Littlepage-Buggs	11 – Littlepage-Buggs	8 – Bickle	Ferrell Center (4,011); Waco, TX
January 22, 2023; 4:00 p.m., ESPN2		No. 25 Texas	L 55–68	13–6 (4–3)	19 – Andrews	10 – Buckle	3 – Tied	Ferrell Center (5,593); Waco, TX
January 28, 2023; 2:00 p.m., ESPN+		at Texas Tech	W 79–59	14–6 (5–3)	16 – Tied	12 – Buckle	4 – Andrews	United Supermarkets Arena (8,235); Lubbock, TX
February 1, 2023; 7:00 p.m., ESPN+		Kansas	W 77–73	15–6 (6–3)	23 – Andrews	10 – Littlepage-Buggs	8 – Andrews	Ferrell Center (1,157); Waco, TX
February 4, 2023; 4:00 p.m., ESPNU		at No. 12 Iowa State	W 76–70	16–6 (7–3)	21 – Andrews	12 – Littlepage-Buggs	8 – Owens	Hilton Coliseum (11,788); Ames, IA
February 7, 2023; 7:00 p.m., ESPN+		No. 16 Oklahoma	L 92–98 ^{OT}	16–7 (7–4)	30 – Bickle	17 – Littlepage-Buggs	14 – Owens	Ferrell Center (4,396); Waco, TX
February 11, 2023; 2:00 p.m., ESPN+		at Oklahoma State	L 56–77	16–8 (7–5)	16 – Bickle	13 – Bickle	4 – Andrews	Gallagher-Iba Arena (3,799); Stillwater, OK
February 15, 2023; 6:30 p.m., ESPN+		at Kansas State	L 68–87	16–9 (7–6)	21 – Asberry	8 – Littlepage-Buggs	5 – Tied	Bramlage Coliseum (3,046); Manhattan, KS
February 18, 2023; 5:00 p.m., ESPN+		No. 22 Iowa State	L 77–81 ^{2OT}	16–10 (7–7)	19 – Tied	12 – Tied	10 – Owens	Ferrell Center (5,083); Waco, TX
February 22, 2023; 6:30 p.m., ESPN+		at TCU	W 67–57	17–10 (8–7)	14 – Fontleroy	14 – Littlepage-Buggs	5 – Owens	Schollmaier Arena (2,023); Fort Worth, TX
February 25, 2023; 5:00 p.m., ESPN+		Texas Tech	W 71–61	18–10 (9–7)	21 – Bickle	9 – Fontleroy	5 – Owens	Ferrell Center (5,210); Waco, TX
February 27, 2023; 6:00 p.m., ESPN2		at No. 12 Texas	W 63–54	19–10 (10–7)	19 – Littlepage-Buggs	13 – Littlepage-Buggs	7 – Harmon	Moody Center (10,763); Austin, TX
March 4, 2023; 5:00 p.m., ESPN+		West Virginia	L 52–63	19–11 (10–8)	18 – Asberry	7 – Tied	3 – Tied	Ferrell Center (4,357); Waco, TX
Big 12 tournament
March 10, 2023; 7:00 p.m., ESPN+	(6)	vs. (3) Iowa State; Quarterfinals	L 63–74	19–12	16 – Littlepage-Buggs	6 – Andrews	9 – Andrews	Municipal Auditorium (4,979); Kansas City, MO
NCAA tournament
March 18, 2023*; 4:30 p.m., ESPN2	(7 S3)	vs. (10 S3) Alabama; First Round	W 78–74	20–12	26 – Asberry	7 – Tied	5 – Andrews	Harry A. Gampel Pavilion (8,043); Storrs, CT
March 20, 2023*; 8:00 p.m., ESPN	(7 S3)	at (2 S3) No. 6 UConn; Second Round	L 58–77	20–13	15 – Asberry	8 – Bickle	4 – Tied	Harry A. Gampel Pavilion (10,167); Storrs, CT
*Non-conference game. ^{#}Rankings from AP poll. (#) Tournament seedings in parentheses. S3=Seattle 3. All times are in Central Time.

== Rankings ==
Ranking movements Legend: ██ Increase in ranking ██ Decrease in ranking — = Not ranked RV = Received votes
	Week																				
Poll	Pre	1	2	3	4	5	6	7	8	9	10	11	12	13	14	15	16	17	18	19	Final
AP	18	18	17	21	21	19	18	24	23	23	18	RV	—	RV	RV						
Coaches	17	17*	17	20	22	19	18	23	22	21	17	24	RV	RV	RV						

*Coaches did not release a week 1 poll.

== See also ==
2022–23 Baylor Bears men's basketball team
