= 2022–23 Texas A&M–Corpus Christi Islanders women's basketball team =

Intercollegiate basketball season

2022–23 Texas A&M–Corpus Christi Islanders women's basketball

Southland Conference regular season co-champions

WNIT, First round
- Conference: Southland Conference
- Record: 19–12 (14–4 Southland)
- Head coach: Royce Chadwick (11th season)
- Assistant coaches: Roxanne White; Darren Brunson; Gee Lawler
- Home arena: American Bank Center; Dugan Wellness Center

2022–23 Southland Conference women's basketball standings
	Conf.				Overall
Team	W		L	PCT	W		L	PCT
Southeastern Louisiana †	14	–	4	.778	21	–	10	.677
Texas A&M–Corpus Christi	14	–	4	.778	19	–	12	.613
Lamar	12	–	6	.667	20	–	12	.625
Incarnate Word	10	–	8	.556	15	–	14	.517
Texas A&M–Commerce*	10	–	8	.556	14	–	19	.424
McNeese	8	–	10	.444	12	–	19	.387
New Orleans	7	–	11	.389	8	–	20	.286
Northwestern State	7	–	11	.389	11	–	18	.379
Houston Christian	6	–	12	.333	11	–	18	.379
Nicholls	2	–	16	.111	5	–	24	.172
† 2023 Southland tournament winner * ineligible for the 2023 NCAA tournament due to transition period As of March 18, 2023

The 2022–23 Texas A&M–Corpus Christi Islanders women's basketball team represented Texas A&M University–Corpus Christi in the 2022–23 NCAA Division I women's basketball season. The Islanders were led by eleventh-year head coach Royce Chadwick, and played their home games at the American Bank Center and the Dugan Wellness Center, as members of the Southland Conference.

== Previous season ==
The Islanders finished the 2021–22 season 19–10 overall, 11–3 in Southland play, to finish in second place. Their season ended as the No. 2 seed in the Southland women's tournament where they were defeated by Southeastern in the semifinal round.

== Media ==
Home games were broadcast on ESPN+. Video streaming of all non-televised home games and audio for all road games is available at GoIslanders.com.

== Preseason polls ==
=== Southland Conference poll ===
The Southland Conference released its preseason poll on October 25, 2022. Receiving 11 first-place votes and 148 votes overall, the Islanders were picked to finish first in the conference.

Predicted finish	Team	Votes (1st place)
1	Texas A&M–Corpus Christi	148 (11)
2	Houston Christian	131 (5)
3	Southeastern	122 (3)
4	Lamar	103
5	Texas A&M–Commerce Lions	101(1)
6	McNeese	98
7	Incarnate Word	64
8	Northwestern State	61
9	New Orleans	47
10	Nicholls	25

=== Preseason All Conference ===
Makinna Serrata and Alecia Westbrook were selected as members of the Preseason All Conference first team.

== Roster ==
2022–23 Texas A&M–Corpus Christi Islanders women's basketball team
Players
Coaches

Pos.	#	Name	Height	Year	Hometown
G	2	Deja Williams	5 ft 7 in (1.7 m)	Jr	Manvel, TX
G	3	Jaeda Whitner	5 ft 5 in (1.65 m)	So	Mason City, IA
G	10	Hayle Campbell	5 ft 7 in (1.7 m)	Sr	Corpus Christi, TX
G	11	Paige Allen	5 ft 8 in (1.73 m)	Jr	Kansas City, MO
F/C	13	Alecia Westbrook	6 ft 1 in (1.85 m)	Sr	Kansas City, MO
C	14	Bruna Anguera	6 ft 2 in (1.88 m)	Fr	El Morell, Spain
G	15	Sasha Shishkina	5 ft 8 in (1.73 m)	Jr	Moscow, Russia
G	20	Makinna Serrata	6 ft 0 in (1.83 m)	RS Sr	Tilden, TX
G	21	Maya Ellis	5 ft 8 in (1.73 m)	So	Chesterfield, VA
F	23	Kristen Daniels	5 ft 11 in (1.8 m)	GS	Lake Charles, LA
G	24	Violeta Verano	5 ft 9 in (1.75 m)	Jr	Barcelona, Spain
G	25	Mireia Aguado	5 ft 9 in (1.75 m)	Jr	Barcelona, Spain
G	30	Annukka Willstedt	5 ft 9 in (1.75 m)	So	Torrelodones, Spain
F	32	Nabaweeya McGill	6 ft 2 in (1.88 m)	Jr	Tampa, FL
C	35	Justice Odom	6 ft 2 in (1.88 m)	Jr	Indianapolis, IN

Head coach

- Royce Chadwick (Southwestern Oklahoma State)

Assistant coach(es)

- Roxanne White (Stephen F. Austin)
- Darren Brunson (St. Mary's (TX))
- Gee Lawler (Texas A&M–Corpus Christi)

Legend

- (C) Team captain
- (S) Suspended
- (I) Ineligible
- (W) Walk-on
- Injured
- Current redshirt

Roster
Last update: April 6, 2024

== Schedule and results ==
Date time, TV	Rank^{#}	Opponent^{#}	Result	Record	Site (attendance) city, state
Non-conference exhibition season
Oct 31, 2022*; 7:00 pm		Huston–Tillotson	W 56–43		Dugan Wellness Center (768); Corpus Christi, TX
Non-conference regular season
Nov 7, 2022*; 5:30 pm, ESPN+		at Texas Tech	L 49–69	0–1	United Supermarkets Arena (3,150); Lubbock, TX
Nov 10, 2022*; 7:00 pm		at Texas A&M	L 45–69	0–2	Reed Arena (3,085); College Station, TX
Nov 16, 2022*; 7:00 pm, ESPN+		Texas Lutheran	W 70–38	1–2	Dugan Wellness Center (1,024); Corpus Christi, TX
Nov 20, 2022*; 2:00 pm, ESPN+		Western Colorado	W 63–46	2–2	Dugan Wellness Center (571); Corpus Christi, TX
Nov 24, 2022*; 12:30 pm		vs. Stony Brook	L 58–63	2–3	Coliseo Roberto Clemente (100); San Juan, PR
Nov 25, 2022*; 12:30 pm		vs. Nebraska	L 44–73	2–4	Coliseo Roberto Clemente (100); San Juan, PR
Nov 29, 2022*; 12:00 pm, ESPN+		at UTRGV; South Texas Showdown	L 65–68 ^{OT}	2–5	UTRGV Fieldhouse (2,786); Edinburg, TX
Dec 3, 2022*; 2:00 pm, ESPN+		UTRGV; South Texas Showdown	W 65–58	3–5	American Bank Center (1,448); Corpus Christi, TX
Dec 12, 2022*; 7:00 pm, ESPN+		St. Thomas (TX)	W 80–23	4–5	Dugan Wellness Center (589); Corpus Christi, TX
Dec 16, 2022*; 7:00 pm, ESPN+		at Texas State	W 56–47	5–5	Strahan Arena (565); San Marcos, TX
Dec 19, 2022*; 7:00 pm, ESPN+		Washington State	L 49–75	5–6	Dugan Wellness Center (759); Corpus Christi, TX
Southland Conference regular season
Dec 30, 2022; 1:00 pm		at Northwestern State	W 65–50	6–6 (1–0)	Prather Coliseum (485); Natchitoches, LA
Jan 4, 2023; 5:00 pm, ESPN+		Incarnate Word	W 59–51	7–6 (2–0)	Dugan Wellness Center (1,319); Corpus Christi, TX
Jan 7, 2023; 2:00 pm, ESPN+		at Incarnate Word	W 65–58	8–6 (3–0)	McDermott Center; San Antonio, TX
Jan 12, 2023; 5:00 pm, ESPN+		Southeastern Louisiana	L 46–53	8–7 (3–1)	American Bank Center (984); Corpus Christi, TX
Jan 14, 2023; 1:00 pm, ESPN+		New Orleans	W 58–45	9–7 (4–1)	American Bank Center (1,137); Corpus Christi, TX
Jan 19, 2023; 5:00 pm, ESPN+		Lamar	W 61–59	10–7 (5–1)	Montagne Center (1,023); Beaumont, TX
Jan 21, 2023; 2:00 pm, ESPN+		at Houston Christian	W 57–42	11–7 (6–1)	Sharp Gymnasium (217); Houston, TX
Jan 26, 2023; 5:00 pm, ESPN+		Nicholls	W 86–47	12–7 (7–1)	American Bank Center (1,027); Corpus Christi, TX
Jan 28, 2023; 1:00 pm, ESPN+		McNeese	W 78–61	13–7 (8–1)	American Bank Center (1,787); Corpus Christi, TX
Feb 2, 2023; 5:00 pm, ESPN+		at New Orleans	W 68–49	14–7 (9–1)	Lakefront Arena (309); New Orleans, LA
Feb 4, 2023; 1:00 pm, ESPN+		at Southeastern Louisiana	L 51–59	14–8 (9–2)	University Center (537); Hammond, LA
Feb 9, 2023; 5:00 pm, ESPN+		Houston Christian	L 52–55	14–9 (9–3)	American Bank Center (1,004); Corpus Christi, TX
Feb 11, 2023; 1:00 pm, ESPN+		Lamar	L 68–73	14–10 (9–4)	American Bank Center (1,266); Corpus Christi, TX
Feb 16, 2023; 5:00 pm, ESPN+		at Nicholls	W 59–50	15–10 (10–4)	Stopher Gymnasium (434); Thibodaux, LA
Feb 18, 2023; 1:00 pm, ESPN3		at McNeese	W 75–62	16–10 (11–4)	The Legacy Center (1,570); Lake Charles, LA
Feb 23, 2023; 5:00 pm, ESPN+		Texas A&M–Commerce	W 83–58	17–10 (12–4)	American Bank Center (1,132); Corpus Christi, TX
Feb 25, 2023; 12:00 pm, ESPN3		Northwestern State	W 82–54	18–10 (13–4)	American Bank Center (1,229); Corpus Christi, TX
Mar 1, 2023; 5:30 pm, ESPN+		at Texas A&M–Commerce	W 61–53	19–10 (14–4)	Texas A&M–Commerce Field House (382); Commerce, TX
2023 Jersey Mike's Subs Southland women's basketball tournament
March 8, 2023; 1:30 pm, ESPN+	(2)	vs. (3) Lamar; Semifinals	L 53–65	19–11	The Legacy Center; Lake Charles, LA
WNIT
March 17, 2023; 8:30 p.m., MW Network		at Wyoming; First round	L 41–75	19–12	Arena-Auditorium (2,820); Laramie, WY
*Non-conference game. ^{#}Rankings from AP poll. (#) Tournament seedings in parentheses. All times are in Central Time.

== See also ==
- 2022–23 Texas A&M–Corpus Christi Islanders men's basketball team
