= 2022–23 Southeastern Louisiana Lady Lions basketball team =

Intercollegiate basketball season

2022–23 Southeastern Louisiana Lady Lions basketball

Southland Conference regular-season co-champions Southland tournament champions

NCAA tournament, first round
- Conference: Southland Conference
- Record: 21–10 (14–4 Southland)
- Head coach: Ayla Guzzardo (6th season)
- Assistant coaches: Kenneth Lee Jr.; Aja Ochie; Ronneka Robertson
- Home arena: University Center

2022–23 Southland Conference women's basketball standings
	Conf.				Overall
Team	W		L	PCT	W		L	PCT
Southeastern Louisiana †	14	–	4	.778	21	–	10	.677
Texas A&M–Corpus Christi	14	–	4	.778	19	–	12	.613
Lamar	12	–	6	.667	20	–	12	.625
Incarnate Word	10	–	8	.556	15	–	14	.517
Texas A&M–Commerce*	10	–	8	.556	14	–	19	.424
McNeese	8	–	10	.444	12	–	19	.387
New Orleans	7	–	11	.389	8	–	20	.286
Northwestern State	7	–	11	.389	11	–	18	.379
Houston Christian	6	–	12	.333	11	–	18	.379
Nicholls	2	–	16	.111	5	–	24	.172
† 2023 Southland tournament winner * ineligible for the 2023 NCAA tournament due to transition period As of March 18, 2023

The 2022–23 Southeastern Louisiana Lady Lions basketball team represented Southeastern Louisiana University in the 2022–23 NCAA Division I women's basketball season. The Lady Lions were led by sixth-year head coach Ayla Guzzardo, and played their home games at University Center in Hammond, Louisiana as members of the Southland Conference.

The Lady Lions finished the season 21–10 overall, 14–4 in Southland play, to finish in first place. With a first-round bye, they defeated Texas A&M–Commerce in the semifinals of the Southland women's tournament. They defeated Lamar in the tournament championship game, winning the conference auto-bid to the 2023 NCAA Division I women's basketball tournament. The Lady Lions' season ended when they were defeated by No. 3 Iowa in the first round.

== Previous season ==
The Lady Lions finished the 2021–22 season 16–11 overall, 10–4 in Southland play, to finish in third place. They defeated Texas A&M–Corpus Christi in the first round of the Southland women's tournament. The Lady Lions' season ended when they were defeated by Incarnate Word in the finals.

== Media ==
Home games were broadcast on ESPN+.

== Preseason polls ==
=== Southland Conference Poll ===
The Southland Conference released its preseason poll on October 25, 2022. Receiving three first-place votes and 122 votes overall, the Lady Lions were picked to finish third in the conference.

Predicted finish	Team	Votes (1st place)
1	Texas A&M–Corpus Christi	148 (11)
2	Houston Christian	131 (5)
3	Southeastern	122 (3)
4	Lamar	103
5	Texas A&M–Commerce Lions	101(1)
6	McNeese	98
7	Incarnate Word	64
8	Northwestern State	61
9	New Orleans	47
10	Nicholls	25

=== Preseason All Conference ===
Hailey Giaratano was selected as a member of the second team for the third time.

== Roster ==
2022–23 Southeastern Louisiana Lions women's basketball team
Players
Coaches

Pos.	#	Name	Height	Year	Previous school	Hometown
G	1	Jalencia Pierre	5 ft 5 in (1.65 m)	Fr	Amite HS	Springfield, LA
G	2	Cierria Cunningham	5 ft 7 in (1.7 m)	Sr	Hillcrest HS; Shelton State CC	Tuscaloosa, AL
G	3	Allasia Washington	5 ft 8 in (1.73 m)	Fr	Madison Prep Academy	Baton Rouge, LA
G	5	Taylor Bell	5 ft 11 in (1.8 m)	So	Huntington HS	Shreveport, LA
G	10	Jaylen Huderson	5 ft 7 in (1.7 m)	Jr	Salmen HS	Slidell, LA
F	12	Terri Crawford	6 ft 1 in (1.85 m)	So	Ramsay HS; Central Arkansas	Birmingham, AL
G	13	Chrissy Brown	5 ft 9 in (1.75 m)	Sr	Carencro HS; Neosha CC	Lafayette, LA
G	15	Daija Harvey	5 ft 9 in (1.75 m)	Jr	Donaldsonville HS	Donaldsonville, LA
F	22	Taylor Dupree	6 ft 2 in (1.88 m)	RS Fr	Northwest Rankin HS; UT Martin	Brandon, MS
G	24	Dijone' Flowers	5 ft 7 in (1.7 m)	So	Live Oak HS; Lamar	Denham Springs, LA
G	31	Alexius Horne	5 ft 9 in (1.75 m)	Jr	Denham Springs HS	Baton Rouge, LA
F	35	Natalie Kelly	6 ft 3 in (1.91 m)	Sr	Albany HS; Auburn	Albany, LA
G	55	Hailey Giaratano	5 ft 10 in (1.78 m)	Jr	Ponchatoula HS	Ponchatoula, LA

Head coach

- Ayla Guzzardo (Akron)

Assistant coach(es)

- Kenneth Lee Jr. (Nicholls State)
- Aja Ochie (Southeastern Louisiana)
- Ronneka Robertson (South Alabama)

Legend

- (C) Team captain
- (S) Suspended
- (I) Ineligible
- (W) Walk-on
- Injured
- Current redshirt

Roster
Last update: April 22, 2025

== Schedule and results ==
Date time, TV	Rank^{#}	Opponent^{#}	Result	Record	Site (attendance) city, state
Non-conference regular season
November 7, 2022*; 5:00 p.m., ESPN3		LSU–Alexandria	W 73–27	1–0	University Center (412); Hammond, LA
November 11, 2022*; 4:00 p.m.		at Utah State	W 78–68	2–0	Smith Spectrum (381); Logan, UT
November 13, 2022*; 8:00 p.m.		at Utah	L 62–99	2–1	Jon M. Huntsman Center (1,386); Salt Lake City, UT
November 15, 2022*; 8:00 p.m.		at San Diego State	L 53–69	2–2	Viejas Arena (365); San Diego, CA
November 22, 2022*; 7:00 p.m., ESPN+		at South Alabama	W 64–40	3–2	Mitchell Center (277); Mobile, AL
November 25, 2022*; 7:00 p.m., ESPN+		Dillard	W 90–34	4–2	University Center (410); Hammond, LA
November 29, 2022*; 7:00 p.m., SECN+		at LSU	L 55–63	4–3	Pete Maravich Assembly Center (6,592); Baton Rouge, LA
December 13, 2022*; 5:30 p.m., ESPN+		Prairie View A&M	W 84–57	5–3	University Center (359); Hammond, LA
December 20, 2022*; 2:00 p.m., SECN+		at Alabama	L 45–55	5–4	Coleman Coliseum (1,888); Tuscaloosa, AL
December 23, 2022*; 1:00 p.m.		at Jackson State	L 51–60	5–5	Williams Assembly Center (350); Jackson, MS
Southland Conference regular season
December 31, 2022; 1:00 p.m., ESPN+		at Nicholls	W 57–49	6–5 (1–0)	Stopher Gymnasium (202); Thibodaux, LA
January 5, 2023; 5:00 p.m., ESPN+		Houston Christian	W 63–58	7–5 (2–0)	University Center (412); Hammond, LA
January 7, 2023; 1:00 p.m., ESPN+		Lamar	L 47–57	7–6 (2–1)	University Center (249); Hammond, LA
January 12, 2023; 5:00 p.m., ESPN+		at Texas A&M–Corpus Christi	W 53–46	8–6 (3–1)	American Bank Center (984); Corpus Christi, TX
January 14, 2023; 2:00 p.m., ESPN+		at Incarnate Word	L 49–55	8–7 (3–2)	McDermott Center (195); San Antonio, TX
January 19, 2023; 5:00 p.m., ESPN+		Northwestern State	W 63–48	9–7 (4–2)	University Center (683); Hammond, LA
January 21, 2023; 1:00 p.m., ESPN+		Texas A&M–Commerce	W 46–42	10–7 (5–2)	University Center (466); Hammond, LA
January 26, 2023; 5:00 p.m., ESPN+		New Orleans	W 69–51	11–7 (6–2)	University Center (519); Hammond, LA
January 28, 2023; 2:00 p.m., ESPN+		at New Orleans	L 42–59	11–8 (6–3)	Lakefront Arena (412); New Orleans, LA
February 2, 2023; 5:00 p.m., ESPN+		Incarnate Word	W 72–50	12–8 (7–3)	University Center (379); Hammond, LA
February 4, 2023; 1:30 p.m., ESPN+		Texas A&M–Corpus Christi	W 59–51	13–8 (8–3)	University Center (537); Hammond, LA
February 9, 2023; 5:00 p.m., ESPN+		at McNeese	W 72–64 ^{OT}	14–8 (9–3)	The Legacy Center (1,628); Lake Charles, LA
February 11, 2023; 1:00 p.m., ESPN+		Nicholls	W 90–52	15–8 (10–3)	University Center (334); Hammond, LA
February 16, 2023; 5:30 p.m., ESPN+		at Northwestern State	W 65–50	16–8 (11–3)	Prather Coliseum (715); Natchitoches, LA
February 18, 2023; 2:00 p.m., ESPN3		at Texas A&M–Commerce	W 66–55	17–8 (12–3)	The Field House (342); Commerce, TX
February 23, 2023; 5:00 p.m., ESPN+		at Lamar	L 54–66	17–9 (12–4)	Montagne Center (1,421); Beaumont, TX
February 25, 2023; 1:00 p.m., ESPN3		McNeese	W 67–50	18–9 (13–4)	University Center (520); Hammond, LA
March 1, 2023; 5:00 p.m., ESPN+		at Houston Christian	W 66–45	19–9 (14–4)	Sharp Gymnasium (402); Houston, TX
2023 Jersey Mike's Subs Southland Basketball Tournament
March 8, 2023; 11:00 a.m., ESPN+	(1)	(5) Texas A&M–Commerce; Semifinals	W 60–58 ^{OT}	20–9	The Legacy Center; Lake Charles, LA
March 9, 2023; 4:00 p.m., ESPNU	(1)	(3) Lamar; Championship	W 66–57	21–9	The Legacy Center (606); Lake Charles, LA
NCAA tournament
March 17, 2023; 3:00 p.m., ESPN	(15 S4)	at (2 S4) No. 3 Iowa; First round	L 43–95	21–10	Carver–Hawkeye Arena (14,382); Iowa City, IA
*Non-conference game. ^{#}Rankings from AP poll. (#) Tournament seedings in parentheses. All times are in Central.

== See also ==
- 2022–23 Southeastern Louisiana Lions basketball team
