= 2022–23 McNeese Cowgirls basketball team =

Intercollegiate basketball season

2022–23 McNeese Cowgirls basketball
- Conference: Southland Conference
- Record: 12–19 (8–10 Southland)
- Head coach: Lynn Kennedy (2nd season)
- Assistant coaches: Carley Meister; Steve Yang; Kiana Brown
- Home arena: The Legacy Center (Capacity: 4,200)

2022–23 Southland Conference women's basketball standings
	Conf.				Overall
Team	W		L	PCT	W		L	PCT
Southeastern Louisiana †	14	–	4	.778	21	–	10	.677
Texas A&M–Corpus Christi	14	–	4	.778	19	–	12	.613
Lamar	12	–	6	.667	20	–	12	.625
Incarnate Word	10	–	8	.556	15	–	14	.517
Texas A&M–Commerce*	10	–	8	.556	14	–	19	.424
McNeese	8	–	10	.444	12	–	19	.387
New Orleans	7	–	11	.389	8	–	20	.286
Northwestern State	7	–	11	.389	11	–	18	.379
Houston Christian	6	–	12	.333	11	–	18	.379
Nicholls	2	–	16	.111	5	–	24	.172
† 2023 Southland tournament winner * ineligible for the 2023 NCAA tournament due to transition period As of March 18, 2023

The 2022–23 McNeese Cowgirls basketball team represented McNeese State University during the 2022–23 NCAA Division I women's basketball season. The Cowgirls, led by second year head coach Lynn Kennedy, played their home games at The Legacy Center located on the McNeese State University campus in Lake Charles, Louisiana. They were members of the Southland Conference.

== Previous season ==
The Cowgirls finished the 2021–22 season with a 13–15 record overall and an 8–6 record in conference play. They qualified for the 2022 Southland Conference women's basketball tournament as the No. 4 seed. Their season ended with a 63–90 loss to No. 5 seeded Incarnate Word.

== Preseason polls ==
=== Southland Conference Poll ===
The Southland Conference released its preseason poll on October 25, 2022. Receiving 98 votes, the Cowgirls were picked to finish sixth in the conference.

Predicted finish	Team	Votes (1st place)
1	Texas A&M–Corpus Christi	148 (11)
2	Houston Christian	131 (5)
3	Southeastern	122 (3)
4	Lamar	103
5	Texas A&M–Commerce Lions	101(1)
6	McNeese	98
7	Incarnate Word	64
8	Northwestern State	61
9	New Orleans	47
10	Nicholls	25

=== Preseason All Conference ===
Kali Chamberlin was selected as a returning member of the Preseason All Conference first team. Desirae Hansen was selected as a member of the second team for the third time.

== Roster ==
2022–23 McNeese State Cowgirls women's basketball team
Players
Coaches

Pos.	#	Name	Height	Year	Hometown
G	1	Le'Shenae Stubblefield	5 ft 7 in (1.7 m)	Sr	Delhi, LA
G	2	Kaili Chamberlin	5 ft 9 in (1.75 m)	So	Medford, OR
G	3	Stephanie Guihon	5 ft 6 in (1.68 m)	GS	Largo, MD
G	5	Cristina Gil	5 ft 8 in (1.73 m)	So	Barcelona, Spain
F	13	Alicja Falkowska	6 ft 5 in (1.96 m)	Sr	Kosów Lacki, Poland
G	14	Mireia Yespes	6 ft 2 in (1.88 m)	So	Barcelona, Spain
F	15	Marta Hermoso	6 ft 2 in (1.88 m)	Fr	Seville, Spain
G	20	Clara Rosini	5 ft 10 in (1.78 m)	So	Trieste, Italy
F	21	Autumn Watts	6 ft 1 in (1.85 m)	RS So	Centennial, CO
F	22	Grace Wener	6 ft 4 in (1.93 m)	Fr	Kissimmee, FL
G	23	Zuzanna Kulinska	5 ft 10 in (1.78 m)	Sr	Gdynia, Poland
G	24	Divine Tanks	5 ft 10 in (1.78 m)	Sr	Lake Charles, LA
F	30	Paris Mullins	6 ft 2 in (1.88 m)	Jr	McDonough, GA
G	33	Gabrielle Wener	6 ft 3 in (1.91 m)	So	Kissimmee, FL
G	53	Desirae Hansen	6 ft 0 in (1.83 m)	Sr	Rainier, OR

Head coach

- Lynn Kennedy Bushnell/(Northwest College)

Assistant coach(es)

- Carly Meister (Southern Oregon)
- Steve Yang (Missouri State)
- Kiana Brown (Portland State)

Legend

- (C) Team captain
- (S) Suspended
- (I) Ineligible
- (W) Walk-on
- Injured
- Current redshirt

Roster
Last update: November 10, 2022

== Schedule ==
Date time, TV	Rank^{#}	Opponent^{#}	Result	Record	Site (attendance) city, state
Non-conference regular season
Nov 7, 2022*; 11:00 am		Ecclesia College	W 110–26	1–0	The Legacy Center (2,530); Lake Charles, LA
Nov 10, 2022*; 7:00 pm, ESPN+		UTRGV	L 60–68	1–1	The Legacy Center (1,310); Lake Charles, LA
Nov 16, 2022*; 11:00 am, BTN+		at Illinois	L 38–100	1–2	State Farm Center (8,141); Champaign, IL
Nov 19, 2022*; 12:00 pm, ESPN3		at Bradley	L 58–77	1–3	Renaissance Coliseum; Peoria, IL
Nov 20, 2022*; 12:00 pm, BTN+		at No. 8 Ohio State	L 43–99	1–4	Value City Arena (3,351); Columbus, OH
Nov 22, 2022*; 6:00 pm, FloHoops		at Xavier	L 68–84	1–5	Cintas Center (367); Cincinnati, OH
Nov 29, 2022*; 7:00 pm, ESPN+		Arkansas State	L 83–102	1–6	The Legacy Center (1,311); Lake Charles, LA
Dec 1, 2022*; 7:00 pm		North American University	W 81–46	2–6	The Legacy Center (1,286); Lake Charles, LA
Dec 14, 2022*; 7:00 pm, ESPN+		Louisiana–Monroe	W 76–66	3–6	The Legacy Center (1,747); Lake Charles, LA
Dec 17, 2022*; 12:00 pm, SECN+		at Ole Miss	L 60–79	3–7	The Sandy and John Black Pavilion at Ole Miss (1,591); Oxford, MS
Dec 19, 2022*; 7:00 pm, ESPN+		at Texas Tech	L 47–66	3–8	United Supermarkets Arena (4,511); Lubbock, TX
Southland regular season
Dec 31, 2022; 1:00 pm, ESPN+		at Lamar; Battle of the Border	L 61–82	3–9 (0–1)	Montagne Center (1,103); Beaumont, TX
Jan 5, 2023; 5:00 pm, ESPN+		Northwestern State	W 71–65	4–9 (1–1)	The Legacy Center (2,776); Lake Charles, LA
Jan 7, 2023; 1:00 pm, ESPN+		Texas A&M–Commerce	L 71–79	4–10 (1–2)	The Legacy Center (1,760); Lake Charles, LA
Jan 12, 2023; 5:30 pm, ESPN+		at Northwestern State	L 61–62	4–11 (1–3)	Prather Coliseum (773); Natchitoches, LA
Jan 14, 2023; 1:00 pm, ESPN+		Houston Christian	W 69–54	5–11 (2–3)	The Legacy Center (1,884); Lake Charles, LA
Jan 19, 2023; 5:00 pm, ESPN+		at Nicholls	W 77–68	6–11 (3–3)	Stopher Gymnasium (611); Thibodaux, LA
Jan 21, 2023; 1:00 pm, ESPN+		Nicholls	W 70–62	7–11 (4–3)	The Legacy Center (2,173); Lake Charles, LA
Jan 26, 2023; 5:30 pm, ESPN+		at Incarnate Word	W 69–34	8–11 (5–3)	McDermott Center (201); San Antonio, TX
Jan 28, 2023; 1:00 pm, ESPN+		at Texas A&M–Corpus Christi	L 61–78	8–12 (5–4)	American Bank Center (1,787); Corpus Christi, TX
Feb 2, 2023; 5:00 pm, ESPN+		Lamar; Battle of the Border	L 48–79	8–13 (5–5)	The Legacy Center (1,584); Lake Charles, LA
Feb 4, 2023; 2:00 pm, ESPN+		at Texas A&M–Commerce	W 75–67	9–13 (6–5)	Texas A&M–Commerce Field House (271); Commerce, TX
Feb 9, 2023; 5:00 pm, ESPN+		Southeastern Louisiana	L 64–72	9–14 (6–6)	The Legacy Center (1,628); Lake Charles, LA
Feb 11, 2023; 2:00 pm, ESPN+		at New Orleans	L 59–65	9–15 (6–7)	Lakefront Arena (613); New Orleans, LA
Feb 16, 2023; 5:00 pm, ESPN+		Incarnate Word	L 45–69	9–16 (6–8)	The Legacy Center (1,753); Lake Charles, LA
Feb 18, 2023; 1:00 pm, ESPN3		Texas A&M–Corpus Christi	L 62–75	9–17 (6–9)	The Legacy Center (1,570); Lake Charles, LA
Feb 23, 2023; 5:00 pm, ESPN+		at Houston Christian	W 65–60	10–17 (7–9)	Sharp Gymnasium (160); Houston, TX
Feb 25, 2023; 1:00 pm, ESPN3		at Southeastern Louisiana	L 50–67	10–18 (7–10)	University Center (520); Hammond, LA
Mar 1, 2023; 5:00 pm, ESPN+		New Orleans	W 68–56	11–18 (8–10)	The Legacy Center (1,566); Lake Charles, LA
2023 Jersey Mike's Subs Southland Basketball Tournament
March 6, 2023; 1:30 pm, ESPN+	(6)	(7) New Orleans; First round	W 87–82 ^{OT}	12–18	The Legacy Center (448); Lake Charles, LA
March 7, 2023; 1:30 pm, ESPN+	(6)	(3) New Orleans; Second round	L 75–80 ^{OT}	12–19	The Legacy Center (453); Lake Charles, LA
*Non-conference game. ^{#}Rankings from AP Poll. (#) Tournament seedings in parentheses. All times are in Central Time.

== See also ==
- 2022–23 McNeese Cowboys basketball team
