= 2022–23 Houston Christian Huskies women's basketball team =

Intercollegiate basketball season

2022–23 Houston Christian Huskies women's basketball
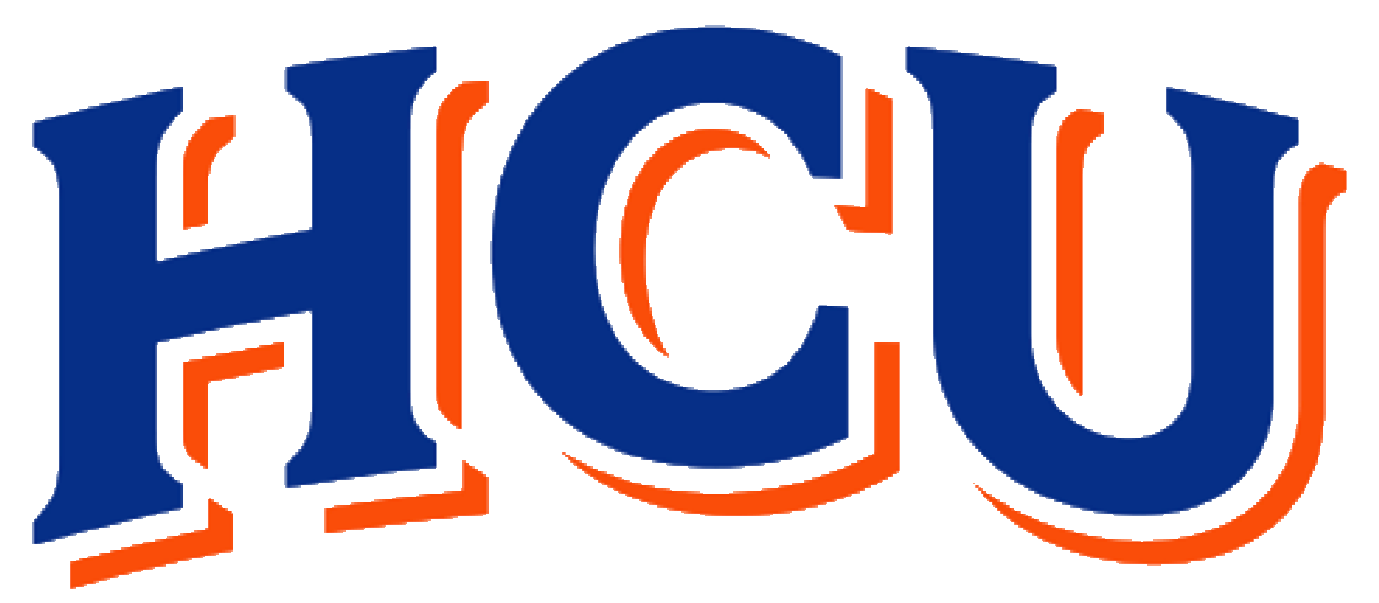
- Conference: Southland Conference
- Record: 11–18 (6–12 Southland)
- Head coach: Donna Finnie (10th season)
- Assistant coaches: Becca Allison; Taylor Stahly; Tyler Doyle
- Home arena: Sharp Gymnasium (Capacity: 1,000)

2022–23 Southland Conference women's basketball standings
	Conf.				Overall
Team	W		L	PCT	W		L	PCT
Southeastern Louisiana †	14	–	4	.778	21	–	10	.677
Texas A&M–Corpus Christi	14	–	4	.778	19	–	12	.613
Lamar	12	–	6	.667	20	–	12	.625
Incarnate Word	10	–	8	.556	15	–	14	.517
Texas A&M–Commerce*	10	–	8	.556	14	–	19	.424
McNeese	8	–	10	.444	12	–	19	.387
New Orleans	7	–	11	.389	8	–	20	.286
Northwestern State	7	–	11	.389	11	–	18	.379
Houston Christian	6	–	12	.333	11	–	18	.379
Nicholls	2	–	16	.111	5	–	24	.172
† 2023 Southland tournament winner * ineligible for the 2023 NCAA tournament due to transition period As of March 18, 2023

The 2022–23 Houston Christian Huskies women's basketball team represented Houston Christian University in the 2019–20 college basketball season. The Huskies, led by tenth year head coach Donna Finnie, played their home games at the Sharp Gymnasium as members of the Southland Conference. The Huskies finished the 2022–23 season with a 11–18 overall record and a 6–12 record and ninth place in conference play. They failed to qualify for the 2023 Southland Conference women's basketball tournament.

== Previous season ==
The Huskies finished the 2021–22 season with a 16–10 overall record and a 12–2 record in conference play winning the Southland Conference regular season championship. They played in the 2022 Southland Conference women's basketball tournament as the No. 1 seed. The team's season ended after losing to No. 5 seed, Incarnate Word 33–55 in the semifinal round.

== Preseason polls ==
=== Southland Conference Poll ===
The Southland Conference released its preseason poll on October 25, 2022. Receiving five first place votes, the Huskies were picked to finish second in the conference.

Predicted finish	Team	Votes (1st place)
1	Texas A&M–Corpus Christi	148 (11)
2	Houston Christian	131 (5)
3	Southeastern	122 (3)
4	Lamar	103
5	Texas A&M–Commerce Lions	101(1)
6	McNeese	98
7	Incarnate Word	64
8	Northwestern State	61
9	New Orleans	47
10	Nicholls	25

=== Preseason All Conference ===
Kennedy Wilson was selected to the Preseason All Conference first team. Julija Vujakovic was selected as a member of the second team

== Roster ==
2022–23 Houston Christian Huskies women's basketball team
Players
Coaches

Pos.	#	Name	Height	Year	Hometown
G	0	Enya Maguire	5 ft 4 in (1.63 m)	Jr	Belfast, Northern Ireland
G	3	Erin Maguire	5 ft 7 in (1.7 m)	Fr	Belfast, Northern Ireland
G	5	Kennedy Wilson	5 ft 6 in (1.68 m)	Sr	Mansfield, TX
F	11	Joy Oly	6 ft 0 in (1.83 m)	Fr	Ettelbruck, Luxembourg
F	12	Amy Cotton	6 ft 0 in (1.83 m)	So	North Adelaide, Australia
G	13	Lauryn Mapusua	5 ft 9 in (1.75 m)	GS	Queensland, Australia
F	14	N'Denasija Collins	6 ft 0 in (1.83 m)	Sr	Mansfield, TX
G	15	Julija Vujakovic	5 ft 11 in (1.8 m)	GS	Bereldange, Luxembourg
G	22	Quincy Erickson	6 ft 0 in (1.83 m)	Jr	Washington, MO
F	23	Emelie Ezukanma	6 ft 3 in (1.91 m)	Fr	Fort Worth, TX
G	24	Cat Hursh	5 ft 9 in (1.75 m)	Jr	Katy, TX
C	25	Abbey Sutherland	6 ft 4 in (1.93 m)	Sr	Hamilton, Victoria, Australia
C	33	Marilyn Nzoiwu	6 ft 3 in (1.91 m)	GS	Round Rock, TX
C	40	Elizabeth Matadi	6 ft 5 in (1.96 m)	So	Irving, TX

Head coach

- Donna Finnie (Heriot–Watt)

Assistant coach(es)

- Becca Allison (Old Dominion)
- Taylor Stahly (Louisiana Tech)
- Tyler Doyle (Louisiana Tech)

Legend

- (C) Team captain
- (S) Suspended
- (I) Ineligible
- (W) Walk-on
- Injured
- Current redshirt

Roster
Last update: November 10, 2022

== Schedule and results ==
Date time, TV	Rank^{#}	Opponent^{#}	Result	Record	Site (attendance) city, state
Non-Conference Schedule
Nov 7, 2022*; 6:00 pm, ESPN+		University of the Southwest (NM)	W 87–33	1–0	Sharp Gymnasium (122); Houston, TX
Nov 11, 2022*; 8:00 pm, BTN+		at No. 22 Nebraska	L 48–79	1–1	Pinnacle Bank Arena (4,264); Lincoln, NE
Nov 16, 2022*; 11:00 am, SECN+		at No. 15 LSU	L 47–101	1–2	Pete Maravich Assembly Center (12,498); Baton Rouge, LA
Nov 25, 2022*; 1:00 pm		at Denver; University of Denver Classic	W 63–58	2–2	Hamilton Gymnasium (296); Denver, CO
Nov 26, 2022*; 3:30 pm		vs. Yale; University of Denver Classic	W 68–61	3–2	Hamilton Gymnasium (355); Denver, CO
Dec 1, 2022*; 5:00 pm, ESPN+		UTRGV	L 51–68	3–3	Sharp Gymnasium (316); Houston, TX
Dec 4, 2022*; 2:00 pm, ESPN+		at No. 21 Baylor	L 35–79	3–4	Ferrell Center (3,935); Waco, TX
Dec 7, 2022*; 5:00 pm, ESPN+		Arlington Baptist	W 101–42	4–4	Sharp Gymnasium (192); Houston, TX
Dec 10, 2022*; 2:00 pm, ESPN+		St. Thomas (TX)	W 68–43	5–4	Sharp Gymnasium (214); Houston, TX
Dec 20, 2022*; 5:00 pm, ESPN+		at Texas State	L 61–67	5–5	Strahan Arena (703); San Marcos, TX
Dec 21, 2022*; 2:00 pm, LHN		at Texas	L 34–96	5–6	Moody Center (5,021); Austin, TX
Southland Conference Schedule
Dec 31, 2022; 12:00 pm, ESPN+		New Orleans	W 68–59	6–6 (1–0)	Sharp Gymnasium (375); Houston, TX
Jan 5, 2023; 5:00 pm, ESPN+		at Southeastern Louisiana	L 58–63	7–5 (2–0)	University Center (412); Hammond, LA
Jan 7, 2023; 2:00 pm, ESPN+		at New Orleans	W 62–54	7–7 (2–1)	Lakefront Arena; New Orleans, LA
Jan 12, 2023; 5:00 pm, ESPN+		Texas A&M–Commerce	L 62–65	7–8 (2–2)	Sharp Gymnasium (206); Houston, TX
Jan 14, 2023; 1:00 pm, ESPN+		at McNeese	L 54–69	7–9 (2–3)	The Legacy Center (1,884); Lake Charles, LA
Jan 19, 2023; 5:00 pm, ESPN+		Incarnate Word	W 71–52	8–9 (3–3)	Sharp Gymnasium (207); Houston, TX
Jan 21, 2023; 2:00 pm, ESPN+		Texas A&M–Corpus Christi	L 42–57	8–10 (3–4)	Sharp Gymnasium (217); Houston, TX
Jan 26, 2023; 5:30 pm, ESPN+		at Northwestern State	L 48–59	8–11 (3–5)	Prather Coliseum (805); Natchitoches, LA
Jan 28, 2023; 2:00 pm, ESPN+		at Texas A&M–Commerce	L 65–73	8–12 (3–6)	Texas A&M–Commerce Field House (384); Commerce, TX
Feb 2, 2023; 5:00 pm, ESPN+		Northwestern State	W 69–58	9–12 (4–6)	Sharp Gymnasium (367); Houston, TX
Feb 4, 2023; 2:00 pm, ESPN+		Nicholls	W 68–55	10–12 (5–6)	Sharp Gymnasium (136); Houston, TX
Feb 9, 2023; 5:00 pm, ESPN+		at Texas A&M–Corpus Christi	W 55–52	11–12 (6–6)	American Bank Center (1,004); Corpus Christi, TX
Feb 11, 2023; 2:00 pm, ESPN+		at Incarnate Word	L 49–65	11–13 (6–7)	McDermott Center (170); San Antonio, TX
Feb 16, 2023; 5:00 pm, ESPN+		at Lamar	L 63–71	11–14 (6–8)	Montagne Center (1,169); Beaumont, TX
Feb 18, 2023; 2:00 pm, ESPN3		Lamar	L 53–55	11–15 (6–9)	Sharp Gymnasium (420); Houston, TX
Feb 23, 2023; 5:00 pm, ESPN+		McNeese	L 60–65	11–16 (6–10)	Sharp Gymnasium (160); Houston, TX
Feb 25, 2023; 1:00 pm, ESPN3		at Nicholls	L 46–64	11–17 (6–11)	Stopher Gymnasium (311); Thibodaux, LA
Mar 1, 2023; 5:00 pm, ESPN+		Southeastern Louisiana	L 45–66	11–18 (6–12)	Sharp Gymnasium (402); Houston, TX
*Non-conference game. ^{#}Rankings from AP Poll. (#) Tournament seedings in parentheses. All times are in Central.

== See also ==
2022–23 Houston Christian Huskies men's basketball team
