= Northwestern State Lady Demons basketball =

Northwestern State Lady Demons
2026–27 Northwestern State Lady Demons basketball team
- University: Northwestern State University
- Head coach: Alan Frey (1st season)
- Location: Natchitoches, Louisiana
- Arena: Prather Coliseum (capacity: 3,900)
- Conference: Southland
- Nickname: Lady Demons
- Colors: Purple, white, and orange trim

NCAA Division I tournament appearances
- 1989, 2004, 2014, 2015

Conference tournament champions
- 2004, 2014, 2015

Conference regular-season champions
- 1984, 1985, 1986, 1995, 1999, 2004

Uniforms
Home	Away

The Northwestern State Lady Demons basketball team is the women's basketball team that represents Northwestern State University in Natchitoches, Louisiana. The team currently competes in the Southland Conference.

== History ==
The Lady Demons first season was 1974–75. As of the end of the 2013–14 season, the team had an overall record of 716–462. Northwestern State, a member of the Southland Conference from 1987 to 1988, has an overall SLC record of 284–170 as of the end of the 2013–14 season.

The Lady Demons have appeared in four NCAA Division I tournaments (1989, 2004, 2014, 2015). The team has also appeared in the WNIT four times (1986, 1993, 1995, and 1999). The team appeared in the 2016 WBI. The Lady Demons have won three Southland Conference regular season titles (1995, 1999, 2004) and three Southland Conference tournament titles (2004, 2014, and 2015).

== Roster ==
2022–23 Northwestern State Demons women's basketball team
Players
Coaches

Pos.	#	Name	Height	Year	Hometown
G	1	Kayla Hampton	5 ft 9 in (1.75 m)	Fr	Bossier City, LA
G	3	Jiselle Woodson	5 ft 5 in (1.65 m)	Jr	Corner, AL
G	4	Karmelah Dean	5 ft 7 in (1.7 m)	Jr	Seattle, WA
G	5	Kelsey Thaxton	5 ft 9 in (1.75 m)	GS	Many, LA
G	10	Shelby Rayner	5 ft 5 in (1.65 m)	Jr	Ulverstone, Tasmania
F	11	Jasmin Dixon	6 ft 3 in (1.91 m)	So	Spring, TX
G	12	Ivona Miljanic	6 ft 0 in (1.83 m)	Fr	Belgrade, Serbia
G	14	Gabrielle Robinson-Forde	6 ft 2 in (1.88 m)	RS Fr	Brampton Ontario Canada
G	15	Candice Parramore	5 ft 7 in (1.7 m)	Sr	Dallas, TX
G	20	Jordan McLemore	5 ft 11 in (1.8 m)	So	Shreveport, LA
G	21	Alecia Whyte	5 ft 10 in (1.78 m)	Jr	Houston, TX
F	22	Joelle Johnson	5 ft 11 in (1.8 m)	Sr	Louisville, KY
C	24	Jordan Todd	6 ft 1 in (1.85 m)	Jr	Eagle River, AK
C	32	Madison Moles	6 ft 6 in (1.98 m)	Fr	Fresno, CA
G	33	Bengisu Alper	5 ft 11 in (1.8 m)	GS	Istanbul, Turkey
G	35	Sharna Ayres	5 ft 10 in (1.78 m)	Jr	Melbourne Australia

Head coach

- Anna Nimz (Pittsburg State)

Assistant coach(es)

- Leasa Ailshie (Sam Houston State)
- Mike Brown (Drake)
- Mike Pittman Grambling State)

Legend

- (C) Team captain
- (S) Suspended
- (I) Ineligible
- (W) Walk-on
- Injured
- Current redshirt

Roster
Last update: November 11, 2022

== NCAA tournament results ==
Year	Seed	Round	Opponent	Result
1989	#10	First Round	#7 Illinois State	L 79-100
2004	#16	First Round	#1 Duke	L 51-103
2014	#16	First Round	#1 Tennessee	L 46-70
2015	#15	First Round	#2 Baylor	L 36-77
