= 2023 Conference USA women's basketball tournament =

U.S. college basketball tournament

- Classification: Division I
- Season: 2022–23
- Teams: 11
- Site: Ford Center at The Star; Frisco, Texas
- Champions: Middle Tennessee (4th title)
- Winning coach: Rick Insell (4th title)
- Television: ESPN+, CBSSN

2022–23 Conference USA women's basketball standings
	Conf.				Overall
Team	W		L	PCT	W		L	PCT
Middle Tennessee†	18	–	2	.900	28	–	5	.848
Western Kentucky	14	–	6	.700	19	–	14	.576
Rice	13	–	7	.650	23	–	9	.719
UTEP	12	–	8	.600	20	–	12	.625
Louisiana Tech	12	–	8	.600	19	–	13	.594
UTSA	9	–	11	.450	13	–	19	.406
North Texas	8	–	12	.400	11	–	20	.355
FIU	7	–	13	.350	14	–	19	.424
Charlotte	7	–	13	.350	12	–	19	.387
UAB	5	–	15	.250	14	–	17	.452
Florida Atlantic	5	–	15	.250	12	–	18	.400
† 2023 C-USA Tournament winner As of March 19, 2023

The 2023 Conference USA women's basketball tournament was held March 8–11, 2023, at Ford Center at The Star in Frisco, Texas. All games of the tournament were televised on ESPN+ except the championship game which aired on CBS Sports Network. The winner of the tournament received the conference's automatic bid to the 2023 NCAA tournament.

== Seeds ==
Teams were seeded by conference record. The top five teams received byes to the quarterfinals.

Seed	School	Conference Record	Tiebreaker
1	Middle Tennessee	18-2	
2	Western Kentucky	14-6	
3	Rice	13-7	
4	UTEP	12-8	2-0 vs. Louisiana Tech
5	Louisiana Tech	12-8	0-2 vs. UTEP
6	UTSA	9-11	
7	North Texas	8-12	
8	FIU	7-13	2-0 vs Charlotte
9	Charlotte	7-13	0-2 vs. FIU
10	UAB	5-15	2-0 vs. North Texas
11	Florida Atlantic	5-15	1-1 vs. North Texas

== Schedule ==
Game	Time	Matchup	Score	Television	Attendance
First Round – March 8, 2023
1	11:00 AM	No. 8 FIU vs. No. 9 Charlotte	59-72	ESPN+	574
2	1:30PM	No. 7 North Texas vs. No. 10 UAB	71-75	ESPN+	789
3	2:00PM	No. 6 UTSA vs. No. 11 Florida Atlantic	69-68	ESPN+	789
Quarterfinals – March 9, 2023
4	11:00AM	No. 1 Middle Tennessee vs. No. 9 Charlotte	84-53	ESPN+	1,708
5	11:30AM	No. 4 UTEP vs. No. 5 Louisiana Tech	64-54	ESPN+	1,708
6	1:00PM	No. 2 Western Kentucky vs. No. 10 UAB	71-67	ESPN+	2,225
7	1:30PM	No. 3 Rice vs. No. 6 UTSA	54-62	ESPN+	2,225
Semifinals – March 10, 2023
8	4:30PM	No. 1 Middle Tennessee vs. No. 4 UTEP	68-62	ESPN+	2,230
9	7:00 PM	No. 2 Western Kentucky vs. No. 6 UTSA	70-55	ESPN+	2,407
Championship – March 11, 2023
10	4:30 PM	No. 1 Middle Tennessee vs. No. 2 Western Kentucky	82-70	CBSSN	
*Game times in CT. ()-Rankings denote tournament seeding.

== Bracket ==
* – Denotes overtime period

First round Wednesday, March 8
8	FIU	59
9	Charlotte	72
7	North Texas	71
10	UAB	75
6	UTSA	69
11	Florida Atlantic	68

Quarterfinals; Thursday, March 9
1	Middle Tennessee	84
9	Charlotte	53
4	UTEP	64
5	Louisiana Tech	54
2	Western Kentucky	71
10	UAB	67
3	Rice	54
6	UTSA	62

Semifinals; Friday, March 10
1	Middle Tennessee	68
4	UTEP	62
2	Western Kentucky	70
6	UTSA	55

Championship; Saturday, March 11
1	Middle Tennessee	82
2	Western Kentucky	70

== See also ==
- 2023 Conference USA men's basketball tournament
- Conference USA women's basketball tournament
- Conference USA
