= List of UTSA Roadrunners women's basketball seasons =

The UTSA Roadrunners women's basketball team represents the University of Texas at San Antonio in women's basketball. The school competes in the American Athletic Conference in Division I of the National Collegiate Athletic Association (NCAA). The Roadrunners play home basketball games at Convocation Center in San Antonio, Texas.

Statistics overview
Season	Coach	Overall	Conference	Standing	Postseason
NCAA independent (1981–1983)
1981–82	Ginny DeHaven	16–11	—	—	—
1982–83	Ginny DeHaven	17–10	—	—	—
OCAC (1983–1985)
1983–84	Ginny DeHaven	21–6	9–1	—	—
1984–85	Bill MacLeay	18–10	9–1	—	—
NCAA independent (1985–1992)
1985–86	Bill MacLeay	18–9	—	—	—
1986–87	Bill MacLeay	18–8	—	—	—
1987–88	Bill MacLeay	10–18	—	—	—
1988–89	Bill MacLeay	9–17	—	—	—
1989–90	Mary Ann McLaughlin	12–16	—	—	—
1990–91	Mary Ann McLaughlin	18–12	—	—	—
1991–92	Mary Ann McLaughlin	4–23	—	—	—
Southland Conference (1992–2006)
1992–93	Mary Ann McLaughlin	11–15	6–12	T-7th	—
1993–94	Mary Ann McLaughlin	15–21	2–16	9th	—
1994–95	Jeff Spivey	7–19	2–16	9th	—
1995–96	Jeff Spivey	8–18	4–14	9th	—
1996–97	Terry Gray	14–13	7–9	6th	—
1997–98	Terry Gray	18–10	9–7	T-4th	—
1998–99	Terry Gray	6–20	3–15	T-10th	—
1999=00	Jeff Dow	7–20	3–15	T-10th	—
2000–01	Rae Rippetoe-Blair	16–13	13–7	4th	—
2001–02	Rae Rippetoe-Blair	16–12	15–5	3rd	—
2002–03	Rae Rippetoe-Blair	18–11	17–3	1st	—
2003–04	Rae Rippetoe-Blair	15–14	10–6	4th	—
2004–05	Rae Rippetoe-Blair	16–12	10–6	5th	—
2005–06	Rae Rippetoe-Blair	18–12	11–5	3rd	—
Southland Conference (West) (2006–2012)
2006–07	Rae Rippetoe-Blair	14–16	9–7	T-4th	—
2007–08	Rae Rippetoe-Blair	23–10	12–4	3rd	NCAA First Round
2008–09	Rae Rippetoe-Blair	24–9	14–2	T-1st	NCAA First Round
2009–10	Rae Rippetoe-Blair	16–14	10–6	3rd	—
2010–11	Rae Rippetoe-Blair	16–15	11–5	T-1st	—
2011–12	Rae Rippetoe-Blair	8–21	4–12	T-4th	—
WAC (2012–2013)
2012–13	Rae Rippetoe-Blair	16–14	10–8	4th	—
Conference USA (2013–2023)
2013–14	Lubomyr Lichonczak	14–17	4–12	15th	—
2014–15	Lubomyr Lichonczak	16–15	11–7	T-4th	—
2015–16	Lubomyr Lichonczak	10–19	6–12	11th	—
2016–17	Lubomyr Lichonczak	14–17	10–8	7th	—
2017–18	Kristen Holt	9–21	6–10	10th	—
2018–19	Kristen Holt	7–19	2–12	T-12th	—
2019–20	Kristen Holt	6–23	2–16	14th	—
2020–21	Kristen Holt	2–18	0–14	7th West	—
2021–22	Karen Aston	7–23	3–11	7th West	—
2022–23	Karen Aston	13–19	9–11	6th	—
American (2023–present)
2023–24	Karen Aston	18–15	10–8	4th	WNIT second round
Total:		493–500 (.496)			
National champion Postseason invitational champion Conference regular season champion Conference regular season and conference tournament champion Division regular season champion Division regular season and conference tournament champion Conference tournament champion
