= 2022–23 Middle Tennessee Blue Raiders women's basketball team =

American college basketball season

2022–23 Middle Tennessee Blue Raiders women's basketball

C-USA regular-season and tournament champions

NCAA tournament, first round
- Conference: Conference USA
- Record: 28–5 (18–2 C-USA)
- Head coach: Rick Insell (18th season)
- Associate head coach: Matt Insell
- Assistant coaches: Kim Brewton; Nina Davis
- Home arena: Murphy Center

2022–23 Conference USA women's basketball standings
	Conf.				Overall
Team	W		L	PCT	W		L	PCT
Middle Tennessee†	18	–	2	.900	28	–	5	.848
Western Kentucky	14	–	6	.700	19	–	14	.576
Rice	13	–	7	.650	23	–	9	.719
UTEP	12	–	8	.600	20	–	12	.625
Louisiana Tech	12	–	8	.600	19	–	13	.594
UTSA	9	–	11	.450	13	–	19	.406
North Texas	8	–	12	.400	11	–	20	.355
FIU	7	–	13	.350	14	–	19	.424
Charlotte	7	–	13	.350	12	–	19	.387
UAB	5	–	15	.250	14	–	17	.452
Florida Atlantic	5	–	15	.250	12	–	18	.400
† 2023 C-USA tournament winner As of March 19, 2023

The 2022–23 Middle Tennessee Blue Raiders women's basketball team represented Middle Tennessee State University during the 2022–23 NCAA Division I women's basketball season. The team was led by eighteenth-year head coach Rick Insell, and played their home games at the Murphy Center in Murfreesboro, Tennessee as a member of Conference USA (C-USA).

The Blue Raiders finished the season 28–5, 18–2 in C-USA play, to finish as C-USA regular-season champions. As the #1 seed in the C-USA tournament, they defeated #9 seed Charlotte in the quarterfinals, #4 seed UTEP in the semifinals, and #2 seed Western Kentucky to win the C-USA tournament championship to earn the conference's automatic bid into the NCAA tournament. They received the #11 seed in the Seattle Regional 4, where they lost to #6 region seed Colorado in the first round.

== Roster ==
2022–23 Middle Tennessee Blue Raiders women's basketball team
Players
Coaches

Pos.	#	Name	Height	Year	Previous school	Hometown
G	1	Courtney Blakely	5 ft 8 in (1.73 m)	So	Bishop Noll	Gary, IN
C	2	Anastasiia Boldyreva	6 ft 6 in (1.98 m)	So	Twice Named Hero of the Soviet Union	Moscow, Russia
G	3	Gracie Dodgen	5 ft 10 in (1.78 m)	So	White County HS	Sparta, TN
G	4	Savannah Wheeler	5 ft 6 in (1.68 m)	Jr	Boyd County HS; Marshall	Catlettsburg, KY
F	5	Kseniya Malashka	6 ft 0 in (1.83 m)	RS Sr	VCU	Minsk, Belarus
G	10	Jalynn Gregory	5 ft 8 in (1.73 m)	So	Macon County HS	Lafayette, TN
F	11	Anabel Latorre Ciria	6 ft 3 in (1.91 m)	Jr	John Madejski Academy	Zaragoza, Spain
G	12	Gracie Hamby	5 ft 8 in (1.73 m)	Fr	Blackman HS	Murfreesboro, TN
G	15	Ta'Mia Scott	6 ft 0 in (1.83 m)	Fr	Clarksville Northwest HS	Clarksville, TN
F	22	Jada Grannum	6 ft 3 in (1.91 m)	Jr	Lincoln Prep	Mississauga, ON
F	23	Alexis Whittington	6 ft 3 in (1.91 m)	Jr	Riverdale HS	Murfreesboro, TN
F	33	Courtney Whitson	6 ft 0 in (1.83 m)	Jr	Dobyns-Bennett HS	Kingsport, TN
C	40	Meioshe Mason	6 ft 4 in (1.93 m)	Fr	Lebanon HS	Lebanon, TN

Head coach

- Rick Insell (Middle Tennessee)

Assistant coach(es)

- Matt Insell (Middle Tennessee)
- Kim Brewton (Liberty)
- Nina Davis (Baylor)

Legend

- (C) Team captain
- (S) Suspended
- (I) Ineligible
- (W) Walk-on
- Injured
- Current redshirt

Roster
Last update: February 15, 2025

== Schedule and results ==
Date time, TV	Rank^{#}	Opponent^{#}	Result	Record	Site (attendance) city, state
Exhibition
October 28, 2022*; 6:00 p.m.		Christian Brothers	W 95–38		Murphy Center; Murfreesboro, TN
November 1, 2022*; 6:00 p.m.		UT–Southern	W 114–43		Murphy Center; Murfreesboro, TN
Non-conference regular season
November 7, 2023*; 6:00 p.m.		at Mercer	L 75–76	0–1	Hawkins Arena (1,226); Macon, GA
November 12, 2023*; 7:00 p.m.		at Southern Illinois	W 90–38	1–1	Banterra Center (570); Carbondale, IL
November 16, 2023*; 6:00 p.m., ESPN+		Belmont	W 80–62	2–1	Murphy Center (2,806); Murfreesboro, TN
November 25, 2023*; 1:00 p.m., FloSports		vs. Texas Tech; Las Vegas Invitational	L 67–72	2–2	The Mirage; Paradise, NV
November 26, 2023*; 1:00 p.m., FloSports		vs. Missouri State; Las Vegas Invitational	W 79–54	3–2	The Mirage; Paradise, NV
December 1, 2022*; 11:00 a.m., ESPN+		Tennessee Tech	W 83–45	4–2	Murphy Center (6,000); Murfreesboro, TN
December 4, 2022*; 4:00 p.m., ESPN+		No. 18 Louisville	W 67–49	5–2	Murphy Center (5,307); Murfreesboro, TN
December 10, 2022*; 2:00 p.m., ESPN+		at Memphis	W 69–53	6–2	Elma Roane Fieldhouse (958); Memphis, TN
December 14, 2022*; 2:00 p.m., ESPN+		Houston	W 68–51	7–2	Murphy Center (2,982); Murfreesboro, TN
C-USA regular season
December 20, 2022; 12:00 p.m., CUSA.tv		at Rice	W 74–68	8–2 (1–0)	Tudor Fieldhouse (591); Houston, TX
December 29, 2022; 6:00 p.m., ESPN+		Charlotte	W 71–46	9–2 (2–0)	Murphy Center (2,292); Murfreesboro, TN
December 31, 2022; 2:00 p.m., CUSA.tv		at Western Kentucky	W 80–75	10–2 (3–0)	E. A. Diddle Arena (865); Bowling Green, KY
January 5, 2023; 6:00 p.m., ESPN+		UTSA	W 80–41	11–2 (4–0)	Murphy Center (2,582); Murfreesboro, TN
January 7, 2023; 3:30 p.m., YouTube		at North Texas	W 76–57	12–2 (5–0)	The Super Pit (1,376); Denton, TX
January 11, 2023; 6:00 p.m., ESPN+		Rice	W 85–56	13–2 (6–0)	Murphy Center (2,982); Murfreesboro, TN
January 16, 2023; 6:00 p.m., CUSA.tv		at UAB	W 76–54	14–2 (7–0)	Bartow Arena (295); Birmingham, AL
January 19, 2023; 5:00 p.m., ESPN+		at Charlotte	W 65–41	15–2 (8–0)	Dale F. Halton Arena (552); Charlotte, NC
January 21, 2023; 1:00 p.m., ESPN+		Louisiana Tech	W 68–50	16–2 (9–0)	Murphy Center (3,411); Murfreesboro, TN
January 26, 2023; 6:00 p.m., ESPN+	No. 23	Florida Atlantic	W 63–48	17–2 (10–0)	Murphy Center (3,168); Murfreesboro, TN
January 28, 2023; 1:00 p.m., ESPN+	No. 23	FIU	W 67–41	18–2 (11–0)	Murphy Center (3,313); Murfreesboro, TN
February 2, 2023; 8:00 p.m., CUSA.tv	No. 21	at UTEP	L 62–65	18–3 (11–1)	Don Haskins Center (998); El Paso, TX
February 4, 2023; 2:00 p.m., ESPN+	No. 21	at UTSA	L 53–58	18–4 (11–2)	Convocation Center (560); San Antonio, TX
February 9, 2023; 6:00 p.m., ESPN+		Western Kentucky	W 94–81	19–4 (12–2)	Murphy Center (3,209); Murfreesboro, TN
February 11, 2023; 5:00 p.m., ESPN+		UAB	W 63–42	20–4 (13–2)	Murphy Center (3,407); Murfreesboro, TN
February 16, 2023; 6:00 p.m., CUSA.tv		at Florida Atlantic	W 85–77	21–4 (14–2)	Eleanor R. Baldwin Arena (729); Boca Raton, FL
February 18, 2023; 11:00 a.m., ESPN+		at FIU	W 85–46	22–4 (15–2)	Ocean Bank Convocation Center (476); Miami, FL
February 25, 2023; 1:00 p.m., ESPN3	No. 25т	at Louisiana Tech	W 61–59	23–4 (16–2)	Thomas Assembly Center (1,637); Ruston, LA
March 2, 2023; 6:00 p.m., ESPN+	No. 24	North Texas	W 72–45	24–4 (17–2)	Murphy Center (3,508); Murfreesboro, TN
March 4, 2023; 2:00 p.m., ESPN+	No. 24	UTEP	W 72–68	25–4 (18–2)	Murphy Center (4,227); Murfreesboro, TN
C-USA tournament
March 9, 2023; 11:00 a.m., ESPN+	(1) No. 25	vs. (9) Charlotte; Quarterfinals	W 84–53	26–4	Ford Center at The Star (1,708); Frisco, TX
March 10, 2023; 4:30 p.m., ESPN+	(1) No. 25	vs. (4) UTEP; Semifinals	W 68–62	27–4	Ford Center at The Star (2,230); Frisco, TX
March 11, 2023; 4:30 p.m., CBSSN	(1) No. 25	vs. (2) Western Kentucky; Championship game	W 82–70	28–4	Ford Center at The Star (837); Frisco, TX
NCAA women's tournament
March 18, 2023*; 6:00 p.m., ESPNews	(11 S4)	vs. (6 S4) No. 21 Colorado; First round	L 60–82	28–5	Cameron Indoor Stadium; Durham, NC
*Non-conference game. ^{#}Rankings from AP poll. (#) Tournament seedings in parentheses. S4=Seattle 4. All times are in Central.

== Rankings ==
Ranking movements Legend: ██ Increase in ranking ██ Decrease in ranking — = Not ranked RV = Received votes т = Tied with team above or below
	Week																				
Poll	Pre	1	2	3	4	5	6	7	8	9	10	11	12	13	14	15	16	17	18	19	Final
AP	—	—*	—	—	—	RV	RV	—	RV	RV	RV	RV	23	21	RV	RV	25т	24	25	RV	Not released
Coaches	—	—*	—^	—	—	RV	RV	RV	RV	RV	RV	RV	RV	23	RV	RV	RV	RV	RV	RV	

*The preseason and week 1 polls were the same.
^Coaches did not release a week 2 poll.

== See also ==
- 2022–23 Middle Tennessee Blue Raiders men's basketball team
