= 2022–23 UAB Blazers women's basketball team =

American college basketball season

2022–23 UAB Blazers women's basketball
- Conference: Conference USA
- West Division
- Record: 14–17 (5–15 CUSA)
- Head coach: Randy Norton (10th season)
- Associate head coach: Taren Martin
- Assistant coaches: Kayla Alexander; Alison Seberger
- Home arena: Bartow Arena

2022–23 Conference USA women's basketball standings
	Conf.				Overall
Team	W		L	PCT	W		L	PCT
Middle Tennessee†	18	–	2	.900	28	–	5	.848
Western Kentucky	14	–	6	.700	19	–	14	.576
Rice	13	–	7	.650	23	–	9	.719
UTEP	12	–	8	.600	20	–	12	.625
Louisiana Tech	12	–	8	.600	19	–	13	.594
UTSA	9	–	11	.450	13	–	19	.406
North Texas	8	–	12	.400	11	–	20	.355
FIU	7	–	13	.350	14	–	19	.424
Charlotte	7	–	13	.350	12	–	19	.387
UAB	5	–	15	.250	14	–	17	.452
Florida Atlantic	5	–	15	.250	12	–	18	.400
† 2023 C-USA tournament winner As of March 19, 2023

The 2022–23 UAB Blazers women's basketball team represented the University of Alabama at Birmingham during the 2022–23 NCAA Division I women's basketball season. The team was led by tenth-year head coach Randy Norton, and played their home games at the Bartow Arena in Birmingham, Alabama as a member of Conference USA.

== Schedule and results ==
Date time, TV	Rank^{#}	Opponent^{#}	Result	Record	Site (attendance) city, state
Exhibition
November 2, 2022*; 6:00 p.m.		Shorter	W 96–53		Bartow Arena; Birmingham, AL
Non-conference regular season
November 7, 2022*; 12:00 p.m., CUSA.tv		Auburn Montgomery	W 85–53	1–0	Bartow Arena (303); Birmingham, AL
November 15, 2022*; 6:00 p.m., CUSA.tv		Nicholls	W 69–40	2–0	Bartow Arena (128); Birmingham, AL
November 21, 2022*; 6:00 p.m., ESPN+		at Valparaiso	W 83–81 ^{OT}	3–0	Athletics–Recreation Center (327); Valparaiso, IN
November 25, 2022*; 1:00 p.m., FloSports		vs. George Mason; Goombay Splash	W 83–74	4–0	Gateway Christian Academy (251); Bimini, Bahamas
November 26, 2022*; 1:00 p.m., FloSports		vs. No. 12 LSU; Goombay Splash	L 64–99	4–1	Gateway Christian Academy (259); Bimini, Bahamas
December 3, 2022*; 2:00 p.m., ESPN+		at Western Carolina	W 71–58	5–1	Ramsey Center (296); Cullowhee, NC
December 13, 2022*; 6:00 p.m.		Miles	W 88–49	6–1	Bartow Arena (322); Birmingham, AL
December 17, 2022*; 2:00 p.m.		Mississippi Valley State	W 101–56	7–1	Bartow Arena (331); Birmingham, AL
December 19, 2022; 10:00 a.m., ESPN+		at Charlotte	L 79–85	7–2 (0–1)	Dale F. Halton Arena (2,190); Charlotte, NC
December 21, 2022*; 12:00 p.m., CUSA.tv		Alcorn State	W 70–56	8–2	Bartow Arena (152); Birmingham, AL
December 29, 2022; 8:00 p.m., CUSA.tv		at UTEP	L 58–76	8–3 (0–2)	Don Haskins Center (1,070); El Paso, TX
December 31, 2022; 12:00 p.m., CUSA.tv		at UTSA	L 68–71	8–4 (0–3)	Convocation Center (458); San Antonio, TX
January 5, 2023; 6:00 p.m., CUSA.tv		Florida Atlantic	W 75–47	9–4 (1–3)	Bartow Arena (335); Birmingham, AL
January 7, 2023; 1:00 p.m., ESPN+		FIU	L 89–91	9–5 (1–4)	Bartow Arena; Birmingham, AL
January 11, 2023; 11:00 a.m., ESPN+		at Western Kentucky	L 71–75	9–6 (1–5)	E. A. Diddle Arena (2,524); Bowling Green, KY
January 14, 2023; 2:00 p.m., CUSA.tv		Louisiana Tech	L 55–61	9–7 (1–6)	Bartow Arena (289); Birmingham, AL
January 16, 2023; 6:00 p.m., CUSA.tv		Middle Tennessee	L 54–76	9–8 (1–7)	Bartow Arena (295); Birmingham, AL
January 21, 2023; 2:00 p.m., ESPN+		at North Texas	W 76–74	10–8 (2–7)	UNT Coliseum (1,513); Denton, TX
January 26, 2023; 6:00 p.m., CUSA.tv		at Louisiana Tech	L 62–67	10–9 (2–8)	Thomas Assembly Center (1,165); Ruston, LA
January 28, 2023; 1:00 p.m., CUSA.tv		Rice	L 57–67	10–10 (2–9)	Bartow Arena (417); Birmingham, AL
February 2, 2023; 6:00 p.m., CUSA.tv		at FAU	L 75–80	10–11 (2–10)	FAU Arena (527); Boca Raton, FL
February 4, 2023; 1:00 p.m., ESPN+		at FIU	L 81–84	10–12 (2–11)	Ocean Bank Convocation Center (522); Miami, FL
February 9, 2023; 11:00 a.m., ESPN+		North Texas	W 61–52	11–12 (3–11)	Bartow Arena (2,209); Birmingham, AL
February 11, 2023; 5:00 p.m., ESPN+		at Middle Tennessee	L 42–63	11–13 (3–12)	Murphy Center (3,407); Murfreesboro, TN
February 17, 2023; 12:00 p.m.		UTEP	L 61–88	11–14 (3–13)	Bartow Arena (72); Birmingham, AL
February 18, 2023; 2:00 p.m.		UTSA	W 67–64	12–14 (4–13)	Bartow Arena (418); Birmingham, AL
February 23, 2023; 7:00 p.m., ESPN+		at Rice	L 58–63	12–15 (4–14)	Tudor Fieldhouse (568); Houston, TX
February 25, 2023; 2:00 p.m.		Western Kentucky	L 69–91	12–16 (4–15)	Bartow Arena (189); Birmingham, AL
March 4, 2023; 12:00 p.m.		Charlotte	W 83–75	13–16 (5–15)	Bartow Arena (323); Birmingham, AL
CUSA Tournament
March 8, 2023; 1:30 p.m., ESPN+	(10)	vs. (7) North Texas; First Round	W 75–71	14–16	Ford Center at The Star (789); Frisco, TX
March 9, 2023; 1:30 p.m., ESPN+	(10)	vs. (2) Western Kentucky; Quarterfinals	L 67–71	14–17	Ford Center at The Star (2,225); Frisco, TX
*Non-conference game. ^{#}Rankings from AP Poll. (#) Tournament seedings in parentheses. All times are in Central.

== See also ==
- 2022–23 UAB Blazers men's basketball team
