= 2022–23 North Texas Mean Green women's basketball team =

American college basketball season

2022–23 North Texas Mean Green women's basketball
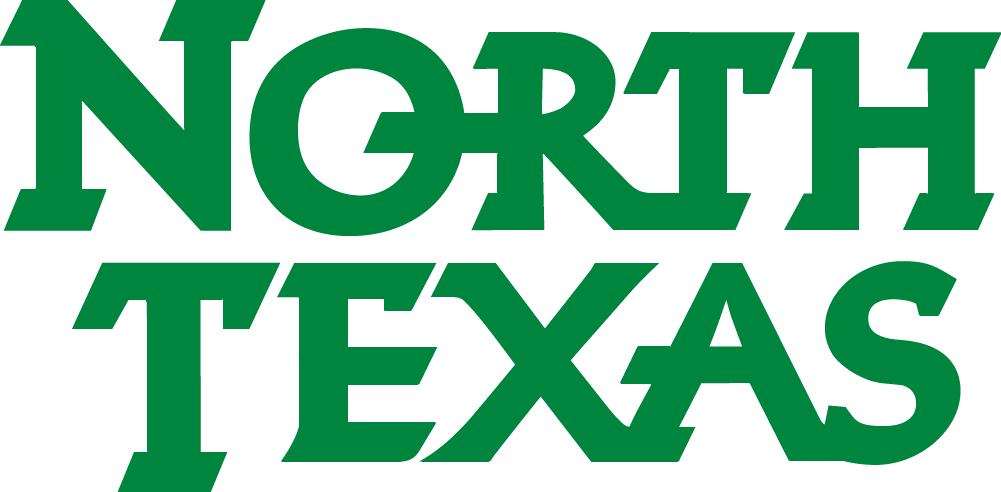
- Conference: Conference USA
- West Division
- Record: 11–20 (8–12 C-USA)
- Head coach: Jalie Mitchell (8th season)
- Assistant coaches: Ciara Carl; Durmon Jennings; Kelby Jones
- Home arena: UNT Coliseum

2022–23 Conference USA women's basketball standings
	Conf.				Overall
Team	W		L	PCT	W		L	PCT
Middle Tennessee†	18	–	2	.900	28	–	5	.848
Western Kentucky	14	–	6	.700	19	–	14	.576
Rice	13	–	7	.650	23	–	9	.719
UTEP	12	–	8	.600	20	–	12	.625
Louisiana Tech	12	–	8	.600	19	–	13	.594
UTSA	9	–	11	.450	13	–	19	.406
North Texas	8	–	12	.400	11	–	20	.355
FIU	7	–	13	.350	14	–	19	.424
Charlotte	7	–	13	.350	12	–	19	.387
UAB	5	–	15	.250	14	–	17	.452
Florida Atlantic	5	–	15	.250	12	–	18	.400
† 2023 C-USA tournament winner As of March 19, 2023

The 2022–23 North Texas Mean Green women's basketball team represented the University of North Texas during the 2022–23 NCAA Division I women's basketball season. They were led by eighth-year head coach Jalie Mitchell, and played their home games at UNT Coliseum in Denton, Texas as a member of Conference USA (C-USA).

The Mean Green finished the season 11–20, going 8–12 in C-USA play to finish in seventh place. They lost to UAB in the opening round of the C-USA tournament.

The season marked the team's last season as members of Conference USA before joining the American Athletic Conference on July 1, 2023.

== See also ==
- 2022–23 North Texas Mean Green men's basketball team
