= 2022–23 NCAA Division I women's basketball season =

- Preseason AP No. 1: South Carolina Gamecocks
- Regular season: November 7, 2022 – March 12, 2023
- NCAA Tournament: 2023
- Tournament dates: March 15 – April 2
- National Championship: American Airlines Center; Dallas, Texas
- NCAA Champions: LSU Tigers
- Other champions: Kansas Jayhawks (WNIT); California Baptist Lancers (WBI)
- Player of the Year (Naismith, Wooden): Caitlin Clark (Iowa Hawkeyes)

The 2022–23 NCAA Division I women's basketball season began on November 7, 2022. The regular season ended on March 12, 2023, with the 2023 NCAA Division I women's basketball tournament beginning on March 14 and ending with the championship game at American Airlines Center in Dallas on April 2.

== Rule changes ==
The following rule changes will be recommended by the NCAA Basketball Rules Committee to the Playing Rules Oversight Panel for 2022−23 season:

== Season headlines ==
- June 21, 2022 – Hartford, which started a transition from Division I to Division III in the 2021–22 school year, was announced as a new member of the D-III Commonwealth Coast Conference (CCC) effective in 2023–24. The CCC press release also confirmed previous reports that Hartford would leave the America East Conference after the 2021–22 season; the Hawks would play the 2022–23 season as a D-I independent.
- June 24 – Incarnate Word, which had announced a move from the Southland Conference (SLC) to the Western Athletic Conference (WAC), backed out of this move and elected to remain in the SLC.
- June 30 – The Big Ten Conference announced that UCLA and USC would join from the Pac-12 Conference in 2024, immediately after the current Pac-12 media contracts expire.
- July 11 – The SLC and Lamar jointly announced that Lamar, which had previously planned to leave the WAC in 2023 to return to the SLC, would expedite this move for the 2022–23 school year.
- July 15 – The WAC announced that starting with the 2023 editions, its men's and women's tournaments would be seeded via a set of advanced metrics that it calls the WAC Résumé Seeding System, developed by statistics guru Ken Pomeroy alongside WAC officials. Tournament entry will still be based on conference record.
- August 3
  - UConn announced that Paige Bueckers, who had been the consensus national player of the year as a freshman in 2020–21, tore her left ACL in a pickup game on August 1 and would miss the entire 2022–23 season.
  - The Colonial Athletic Association announced that Campbell would join from the Big South Conference in 2023.
- August 12 – The Indiana University and Purdue University systems announced that Indiana University–Purdue University Indianapolis will be dissolved in 2024 and replaced by separate IU- and Purdue-affiliated institutions. The current athletic program, the IUPUI Jaguars, will transfer to the new IU Indianapolis.
- August 31 – The Division I Board of Directors adopted a series of changes to transfer rules.
  - Transfer windows were adopted for all Division I sports. Student-athletes who wish to be immediately eligible at their next school must enter the NCAA transfer portal within the designated period(s) for their sport. For women's basketball, the window opens on the day after Selection Sunday and runs for 60 days.
  - Student-athletes who experience head coaching changes, or those whose athletic aid is reduced, canceled, or not renewed, may transfer outside designated windows without penalty.
  - Transferring student-athletes will be guaranteed their financial aid at their next school through graduation.
- September 21 – Houston Baptist University announced it had changed its name to Houston Christian University, effective immediately. The athletic nickname of Huskies was not affected.
- October 14 – Conference USA announced that ASUN Conference member Kennesaw State would join C-USA in 2024.
- October 18 – The Associated Press released its preseason poll. Defending national champion South Carolina was the unanimous #1, marking the Gamecocks' third straight season at the top spot. Other poll highlights:
  - For the first time since 2006, UConn was ranked outside the top 5 in the preseason poll, landing at No. 6.
  - Two programs equaled their highest-ever rankings in any AP poll: Iowa (#4) and Virginia Tech (#13).
  - Three schools were ranked in the preseason for the first time ever: Creighton (#21), South Dakota State (#23), and Princeton (#24).
- October 25 – The AP released its preseason All-America team. South Carolina's Aliyah Boston and Iowa's Caitlin Clark were unanimous choices, joined on the team by Haley Jones of Stanford, Ashley Joens of Iowa State, Elizabeth Kitley of Virginia Tech, and Aneesah Morrow of DePaul.
- November 2 reported that Gonzaga athletic director Chris Standiford and Big 12 Conference commissioner Brett Yormark had met the previous week in the Dallas area regarding a possible Gonzaga move to that conference as a full but non-football member. The report also indicated that Gonzaga had at least some level of talks with the Big East Conference and Pac-12 Conference in the preceding months.
- November 17 – During a meeting in San Francisco, the Regents of the University of California, the governing board of the University of California system, set a date of December 14 for a special meeting to make a final determination on UCLA's planned move to the Big Ten.
- December 14 – The UC Regents approved UCLA's move to the Big Ten. Additionally, conditions were made to mitigate athletes such as investing $12 million in beneficial services including nutritional support and charter flights to reduce travel time. UCLA must also pay the University of California, Berkeley an additional $2 to $10 million due to the move affecting the latter's athletic program, with the precise total being made once the Pac-12 completes its upcoming media rights deal.
- February 8 – UConn lost 59–52 to Marquette, following an 81–77 loss to top-ranked South Carolina in its previous game. This marked the first time since March 1993 that the Huskies had lost consecutive games.
- February 9 – The Big 12 Conference announced that it had reached an agreement with Oklahoma and Texas that will allow the two schools to leave for the Southeastern Conference in 2024 instead of the originally announced 2025 schedule. Approval by the two schools' governing boards was seen as a formality.
- February 24 – In the first sanctions issued by the NCAA regarding name, image, and likeness opportunities, Miami (FL) was placed on one year of probation and received other minor penalties for its involvement in arranging a meeting between alumnus and booster John Ruiz and twin players and social media stars Haley and Hanna Cavinder, who transferred together from Fresno State before the 2022–23 season. Neither Ruiz nor the Cavinder twins received any direct sanctions.
- March 20 – St. Francis Brooklyn announced that it would terminate its athletic program after the spring 2023 semester.
- May 10 – Le Moyne announced it would reclassify to Division I from Division II and join the Northeast Conference effective July 1, 2023.
- May 12 – Western Illinois announced it would leave the Summit League for the Ohio Valley Conference effective July 1, 2023.

=== Milestones and records ===
- December 21 – Caitlin Clark of Iowa reached 2,000 career points in the 75th game of her college career, a 92–54 win over Dartmouth. This equaled Delaware's Elena Delle Donne for the fastest to 2,000 points by a D-I women's player in the current century.
- January 25 – Taylor Robertson of Oklahoma tied Kelsey Mitchell, who played at Ohio State from 2014 to 2018, for the most career three-pointers in D-I women's basketball, at 497. While Robertson was playing in her fifth season due to benefiting from the NCAA's COVID-19 eligibility waiver for the 2020–21 season, she reached the mark in two fewer games than Mitchell (137 to 139).
- January 28 – Robertson took sole possession of the record for career three-pointers in Oklahoma's 86–78 loss to Iowa State.
- March 11 – Iowa State's Ashley Joens became the 14th Division I women's player with 3,000 career points, reaching the mark in the Cyclones' 82–72 win over Oklahoma in the Big 12 tournament semifinals.
- March 18 – Villanova's Maddy Siegrist became the fifth Division I women's player with 1,000 points in a season, reaching the mark in the Wildcats' 76–59 win over Cleveland State in the first round of the NCAA tournament.
- March 31 – Clark reached the following milestones with her 41-point performance in Iowa's 77–73 upset of South Carolina in the NCAA tournament semifinals:
  - The sixth D-I women's player, and second this season, to record 1,000 points in a season
  - The first D-I women's player to score 1,000 points and record 300 assists in the same season (having previously reached the assists mark)
  - The Big Ten Conference record for most points in a season
  - Following her 41-point triple-double against Louisville in the Seattle 4 regional final, Clark also became the first player ever with consecutive 40-point games in either the D-I women's or men's tournament.

== Conference membership changes ==
Twenty-six schools joined new conferences or became independents, including five schools from Division II that started transitions to Division I this season and one in the transition process from Division I to Division III.

As noted previously, Incarnate Word backed out of a planned move from the Southland Conference to the Western Athletic Conference, and Lamar, which had planned to make the opposite move in 2023, pushed this move forward to 2022.

School	Former conference	New conference
Austin Peay	Ohio Valley Conference	ASUN Conference
Belmont	Ohio Valley Conference	Missouri Valley Conference
Bryant	Northeast Conference	America East Conference
Chicago State	Western Athletic Conference	Independent
Hampton	Big South Conference	Colonial Athletic Association
Hartford	America East Conference	Independent
James Madison	Colonial Athletic Association	Sun Belt Conference
Lamar	Western Athletic Conference	Southland Conference
Lindenwood	Great Lakes Valley Conference (D-II)	Ohio Valley Conference
Little Rock	Sun Belt Conference	Ohio Valley Conference
Loyola Chicago	Missouri Valley Conference	Atlantic 10 Conference
Marshall	Conference USA	Sun Belt Conference
Monmouth	Metro Atlantic Athletic Conference	Colonial Athletic Association
Mount St. Mary's	Northeast Conference	Metro Atlantic Athletic Conference
Murray State	Ohio Valley Conference	Missouri Valley Conference
North Carolina A&T	Big South Conference	Colonial Athletic Association
Old Dominion	Conference USA	Sun Belt Conference
Queens	South Atlantic Conference (D-II)	ASUN Conference
Southern Indiana	Great Lakes Valley Conference (D-II)	Ohio Valley Conference
Southern Miss	Conference USA	Sun Belt Conference
Southern Utah	Big Sky Conference	Western Athletic Conference
Stonehill	Northeast-10 Conference (D-II)	Northeast Conference
Stony Brook	America East Conference	Colonial Athletic Association
Texas A&M–Commerce	Lone Star Conference (D-II)	Southland Conference
UIC	Horizon League	Missouri Valley Conference
UT Arlington	Sun Belt Conference	Western Athletic Conference

The 2022−23 season was the last for at least 16 Division I schools in their then-current conferences, and for one Division II school before reclassification to Division I. It was also Hartford's only season as a D-I independent and the last season of athletics for St. Francis Brooklyn.

School	Former conference	New conference
BYU	WCC	Big 12
Campbell	Big South	CAA
Charlotte	C-USA	American
Cincinnati	American	Big 12
Florida Atlantic	C-USA	American
Hartford	Independent	CCC (D-III)
Houston	American	Big 12
Jacksonville State	ASUN	C-USA
Le Moyne	NE-10 (D-II)	NEC
Liberty	ASUN	C-USA
New Mexico State	WAC	C-USA
North Texas	C-USA	American
Rice	C-USA	American
St. Francis Brooklyn	NEC	None (dropped athletics)
Sam Houston	WAC	C-USA
UAB	C-USA	American
UCF	American	Big 12
UTSA	C-USA	American
Western Illinois	Summit	OVC

== Arenas ==
=== New arenas ===
- Alabama A&M opened the new Alabama A&M Events Center on November 18, losing its first game in the new facility 57–36 to Murray State on November 26.
- Fairfield's former home of Alumni Hall was replaced on-site by the new Leo D. Mahoney Arena. The Stags' first game in the new facility was a 77–53 win over Stonehill on November 18.
- Georgia State left GSU Sports Arena for the new Georgia State Convocation Center. The opening ceremony for the new arena was on September 15, with the first event taking place the following day. The Panthers' first official game was a 114–31 win over nearby Division III member Agnes Scott on November 7.
- Texas moved from the Frank Erwin Center to the Moody Center. The Longhorns' first event at the new arena was an intrasquad scrimmage on October 26, followed by two exhibitions at home before the first official game, a 68–45 win over Louisiana on November 11.

=== Arenas of new D-I teams ===
All five new D-I members in 2022–23 play on their respective campuses.

- Lindenwood plays at Robert F. Hyland Performance Arena.
- Queens plays at Curry Arena.
- Southern Indiana plays at Screaming Eagles Arena.
- Stonehill plays at Merkert Gymnasium.
- Texas A&M–Commerce plays at the Texas A&M–Commerce Field House.

=== Arenas closing ===
The following D-I programs plan to open new arenas for the 2023−24 season, or move home games to a pre-existing venue. All will move within their current campuses otherwise indicated.

- Austin Peay will leave the on-campus Winfield Dunn Center for the new F&M Bank Arena in downtown Clarksville, Tennessee after 49 seasons. The new arena was originally planned to open for the 2022–23 season, but was delayed to 2023–24.
- Baylor will leave the Ferrell Center for the new Foster Pavilion; the venue is scheduled to open in the fall of 2023 or early 2024.
- Georgia Southern will leave the Hanner Fieldhouse for the new Jack and Ruth Ann Hill Convocation Center; the venue was scheduled to open in the early fall of 2023, but was delayed until 2024–25 season.
- Longwood will leave Willett Hall for the new Joan Perry Brock Center; the venue is scheduled to open in Summer 2023.
- St. Francis Brooklyn began closing its Remsen Street campus, including Generoso Pope Athletic Complex, at the end of the 2021–22 school year as part of the college's move to a new campus on Livingston Street in Downtown Brooklyn. Home games will at least temporarily be played about 2 miles (3 km) away at Pratt Institute, as the Livingston Street campus has no basketball venue. The final women's basketball game at Pope Athletic Complex was a 64–59 loss to UMBC on November 20.
- Vermont was originally slated to open the new Tarrant Event Center, the replacement for Patrick Gym, in 2021. However, the new arena has since been placed on indefinite hold. Construction was initially halted by COVID-19. With the Tarrant Center being part of a much larger upgrade of UVM's athletic and recreation facilities, UVM chose to prioritize a new student recreation center. Construction of the Tarrant Center is now being hampered by increased borrowing costs.

== Seasonal outlook ==
The Top 25 from the AP and USA Today Coaching polls

=== Pre-season polls ===
AP
Ranking	Team
1	South Carolina (30)
2	Stanford
3	Texas
4	Iowa
5	Tennessee
6	UConn
7	Louisville
8	Iowa State
9	Notre Dame
10	NC State
11	Indiana
12	North Carolina
13	Virginia Tech
14	Ohio State
15	Oklahoma
16	LSU
17	Maryland
18	Baylor
19	Arizona
20	Oregon
21	Creighton
22	Nebraska
23	South Dakota State
24	Princeton
25	Michigan

USA Today Coaches
Ranking	Team
1	South Carolina (30)
2	Stanford (1)
3	Texas
4	Tennessee
5	Louisville
6	UConn т
6	Iowa т
8	NC State
9	Iowa State
10	Notre Dame
11	Indiana
12	North Carolina
13	Virginia Tech
14	LSU
15	Ohio State
16	Oklahoma
17	Baylor
18	Maryland
19	Arizona
20	Oregon
21	Creighton
22	Nebraska
23	Michigan
24	South Dakota State
25	Princeton

=== Final polls ===
AP
Ranking	Team
1	South Carolina (28)
2	Indiana
3	Iowa
4	Virginia Tech
5	Stanford
6	UConn
7	Maryland
8	Utah
9	LSU
10	Villanova т
10	Notre Dame т
12	Ohio State
13	Duke
14	UCLA
15	Texas
16	Oklahoma
17	Iowa State
18	Michigan
19	Gonzaga
20	North Carolina
21	Colorado
22	UNLV
23	Washington State
24	Tennessee
25	Arizona

USA Today Coaches
Ranking	Team
1	LSU (30)
2	Iowa
3	South Carolina
4	Virginia Tech
5	Maryland
6	Ohio State
7	Indiana
8	Utah
9	UConn
10	Stanford
11	Notre Dame
12	Villanova
13	UCLA
14	Louisville
15	Colorado
16	Duke
17	Oklahoma
18	Miami (FL)
19	Texas
20	Tennessee
21	North Carolina
22	Ole Miss
23	Michigan
24	Florida Gulf Coast
25	Iowa State

== Top 10 matchups ==
Rankings reflect the AP poll Top 25.

=== Regular season ===
- November 14
  - No. 5 UConn defeated No. 3 Texas, 83–76 (Harry A. Gampel Pavilion, Storrs, Connecticut)
- November 20
  - No. 5 UConn defeated No. 10 NC State, 91–69 (XL Center, Hartford, Connecticut)
  - No. 6 Louisville defeated No. 3 Texas, 71–63 (Imperial Arena, Paradise Island, Bahamas)
  - No. 1 South Carolina defeated No. 2 Stanford, 76–71^{OT} (Maples Pavilion, Stanford, California)
- November 27
  - No. 3 UConn defeated No. 9 Iowa, 86–79 (Phil Knight Legacy, Moda Center, Portland, Oregon)
  - No. 8 North Carolina defeated No. 5 Iowa State, 73–64 (Phil Knight Invitational, Moda Center, Portland, Oregon)
- December 1
  - No. 5 Indiana defeated No. 6 North Carolina, 87–63 (ACC–Big Ten Women's Challenge, Simon Skjodt Assembly Hall, Bloomington, Indiana)
- December 4
  - No. 7 Notre Dame defeated No. 3 UConn, 74–60 (Jimmy V Women's Classic, Purcell Pavilion, Notre Dame, Indiana)
- December 18
  - No. 5 Notre Dame defeated No. 6 Virginia Tech, 63–52 (Cassell Coliseum, Blacksburg, Virginia)
- January 12
  - No. 6 Indiana defeated No. 9 Maryland, 68–61 (Simon Skjodt Assembly Hall, Bloomington, Indiana)
- January 13
  - No. 2 Stanford defeated No. 8 UCLA, 72–59 (Pauley Pavilion, Los Angeles, California)
- January 20
  - No. 4 Stanford defeated No. 8 Utah, 74–62 (Maples Pavilion, Stanford, California)
- January 23
  - No. 10 Iowa defeated No. 2 Ohio State, 83–72 (Value City Arena, Columbus, Ohio)
- January 26
  - No. 6 Indiana defeated No. 2 Ohio State, 78–65 (Simon Skjodt Assembly Hall, Bloomington, Indiana)
- January 29
  - No. 9 Utah defeated No. 8 UCLA, 71–69 (Jon M. Huntsman Center, Salt Lake City, Utah)
- February 2
  - No. 6 Iowa defeated No. 8 Maryland, 96–82 (Carver-Hawkeye Arena, Ames, Iowa)
- February 5
  - No. 1 South Carolina defeated No. 5 UConn, 81–77 (XL Center, Hartford, Connecticut)
  - No. 8 Maryland defeated No. 10 Ohio State, 90–54 (Xfinity Center, College Park, Maryland)
- February 9
  - No. 2 Indiana defeated No. 5 Iowa, 87–78 (Simon Skjodt Assembly Hall, Bloomington, Indiana)
- February 12
  - No. 1 South Carolina defeated No. 3 LSU, 88–64 (Colonial Life Arena, Columbia, South Carolina)
- February 21
  - No. 7 Maryland defeated No. 6 Iowa, 96–68 (Xfinity Center, College Park, Maryland)
- February 25
  - No. 8 Utah defeated No. 3 Stanford, 84–78 (Jon M. Huntsman Center, Salt Lake City, Utah)
- February 26
  - No. 6 Iowa defeated No. 2 Indiana, 86–85 (Carver-Hawkeye Arena, Iowa City, Iowa)
- March 4
  - No. 7 Iowa defeated No. 5 Maryland, 89–84 (2023 Big Ten women's basketball tournament, Target Center, Minneapolis, Minnesota)
- March 6
  - No. 7 UConn defeated No. 10 Villanova, 67–56 (2023 Big East women's basketball tournament, Mohegan Sun Arena, Uncasville, Connecticut)

== Regular season ==
=== Early-season tournaments ===
Tournament/event name	Dates	Location	No. Teams	Champions	Notes
Preseason WNIT	November 12–20	Multiple locations	4	Texas Tech	
Dublin Basketball Challenge	November 18–19	National Basketball Arena (Dublin, Ireland)	4	Marist	
Battle 4 Atlantis	November 19–21	Imperial Arena (Nassau, Bahamas)	8	UCLA	
Baha Mar Hoops Pink Flamingo	November 21–23	Baha Mar Convention Center (Nassau, Bahamas)	8	Virginia Tech; Utah	
San Juan Shootout	November 22–26	Coliseo Roberto Clemente (San Juan, PR)	10	Nebraska	
South Point Thanksgiving Shootout	November 22–26	South Point Arena (Enterprise, NV)	10	Indiana	
Cancún Challenge	November 24–26	Moon Palace Golf & Spa Resort (Cancún, Mexico)	10	Oklahoma State/Florida State/Purdue (Mayan); NC State/Northern Iowa (Riviera)	
St Pete Showcase	November 24–26	McArthur Center (St. Petersburg, FL)	4	Portland	
Daytona Beach Invitational	November 25–26	Ocean Center (Daytona Beach, FL)	8	Penn State	
Goombay Splash	November 23–27	Gateway Christian Academy (Bimini, Bahamas)	6	LSU (Goombay); Notre Dame (Bimini)	
Paradise Jam tournament	November 24–27	Sports and Fitness Center (Saint Thomas, USVI)	8	Georgia; Arkansas	
Phil Knight Invitational	November 24−27	Chiles Center, Moda Center, and Veterans Memorial Coliseum (Portland, OR)	8	North Carolina	
Phil Knight Legacy	November 24−27	Chiles Center, Moda Center, and Veterans Memorial Coliseum (Portland, OR)	8	UConn	
Gulf Coast Showcase	November 25–27	Hertz Arena (Estero, FL)	8	Michigan	
West Palm Beach Invitational	December 18–21	Student Life Center (West Palm Beach, FL)	10	West Virginia	
Holiday Hoops Classic	December 19–21	South Point Arena (Enterprise, NV)	6	Cleveland State	

=== Upsets ===
An upset is a victory by an underdog team. In the context of NCAA Division I women's basketball, this generally constitutes an unranked team defeating a team currently ranked in the top 25. This list will highlight those upsets of ranked teams by unranked teams as well as upsets of No. 1 teams. Rankings are from the AP poll. Bold type indicates winning teams in "true road games"—i.e., those played on an opponent's home court (including secondary homes).

Winner	Score	Loser	Date	Tournament/event	Notes
**Villanova**	69–59	No. 24 Princeton	November 11, 2022		
Kansas State	84–83	No. 4 Iowa	November 17, 2022		
Drake	80–62	No. 22 Nebraska	November 19, 2022		
Marquette	68–61	No. 3 Texas	November 19, 2022	Battle 4 Atlantis	
Gonzaga	79–67 ^{OT}	No. 6 Louisville	November 19, 2022	Battle 4 Atlantis	
UCLA	80–63	No. 11 Tennessee	November 20, 2022	Battle 4 Atlantis	
South Dakota State	65–55	No. 10 Louisville	November 21, 2022	Battle 4 Atlantis	
Gonzaga	73–72	No. 23 Tennessee	November 21, 2022	Battle 4 Atlantis	
DePaul	76–67	No. 14 Maryland	November 25, 2022	Fort Myers Tip-Off	
Arkansas	69–53	No. 25 Kansas State	November 26, 2022	Paradise Jam	
**South Florida**	70–65	No. 22 Texas	December 2, 2022		
**Nebraska**	90–67	No. 20 Maryland	December 4, 2022		
Seton Hall	82–78	No. 24 Marquette	December 4, 2022		
St. John's	66–62	No. 13 Creighton	December 4, 2022		
Middle Tennessee	67–49	No. 18 Louisville	December 4, 2022		
**Toledo**	71–68	No. 14 Michigan	December 8, 2022		
**Kansas**	77–50	No. 12 Arizona	December 8, 2022		
South Dakota State	75–71	No. 24 Kansas State	December 10, 2022		Game played in Kansas City, Missouri
South Florida	66–65^{OT}	No. 17 Arkansas	December 21, 2022	San Diego Invitational	
Nebraska	85–79^{3OT}	No. 20 Kansas	December 21, 2022		
Michigan State	83–78	No. 4 Indiana	December 29, 2022		
Clemson	64–59	No. 7 Virginia Tech	December 29, 2022		
**Duke**	72–58	No. 6 NC State	December 29, 2022		
**Florida State**	78–71	No. 13 North Carolina	December 29, 2022		
Illinois	90–86	No. 12 Iowa	January 1, 2023		
Oregon State	77–72	No. 10 UCLA	January 1, 2023		
**Providence**	79–75	No. 25 Creighton	January 4, 2023		
Seton Hall	72–51	No. 24 St. John's	January 4, 2023		
Miami	62–58	No. 22 North Carolina	January 5, 2023		
**Boston College**	79–71	No. 10 NC State	January 5, 2023		
Colorado	77–67	No. 8 Utah	January 6, 2023		
Miami	77–66	No. 9 Virginia Tech	January 8, 2023		
Texas	72–59	No. 23 Kansas	January 10, 2023		
**Oklahoma State**	70–65	No. 18 Baylor	January 11, 2023		
Florida State	91–72	No. 11 NC State	January 12, 2023		
Colorado	72–65	No. 14 Arizona	January 13, 2023		
West Virginia	74–65	No. 18 Baylor	January 15, 2023		
**Washington State**	85–84^{OT}	No. 21 Oregon	January 15, 2023		
USC	55–46	No. 2 Stanford	January 15, 2023		
Texas	68–53	No. 15 Iowa State	January 15, 2023		
Texas Tech	68–64	No. 25 Texas	January 18, 2023		
Oregon State	68–65	No. 23 Oregon	January 20, 2023	Rivalry	
Texas	78–58	No. 14 Oklahoma	January 25, 2023		
**Purdue**	62–52	No. 22 Illinois	January 26, 2023		
**Purdue**	73–65	No. 2 Ohio State	January 29, 2023		
**Washington State**	70–59	No. 19 Arizona	January 29, 2023		
**USC**	71–54	No. 25 Colorado	January 29, 2023		
Kansas State	78–77	No. 12 Iowa State	February 1, 2023		
Georgia Tech	68–62	No. 15 NC State	February 2, 2023		
Santa Clara	77–72	No. 17 Gonzaga	February 2, 2023		
UTEP	65–62	No. 21 Middle Tennessee	February 2, 2023		
UTSA	58–53	No. 21 Middle Tennessee	February 4, 2023		
**Baylor**	76–70	No. 12 Iowa State	February 4, 2023		
Louisville	62–55	No. 11 North Carolina	February 5, 2023	Play4Kay	
Washington	72–67	No. 2 Stanford	February 5, 2023		
Marquette	59–52	No. 4 UConn	February 8, 2023		
Miami	86–82	No. 19 Florida State	February 9, 2023		
Syracuse	75–67	No. 14 North Carolina	February 9, 2023		
West Virginia	73–60	No. 21 Iowa State	February 11, 2023		
Virginia	71–59	No. 22 NC State	February 12, 2023		
**Houston**	71–69	No. 24 South Florida	February 12, 2023		
NC State	77–66^{OT}	No. 19 North Carolina	February 16, 2023		
California	81–78^{OT}	No. 25 USC	February 19, 2023		
**St. John's**	69–64	No. 4 Connecticut	February 21, 2023		
Oklahoma State	73–68	No. 20 Iowa State	February 22, 2023		
**Nebraska**	90–57	No. 25 Illinois	February 22, 2023		
**Washington State**	62–55	No. 17 UCLA	February 23, 2023		
Oregon	73–59	No. 14 Arizona	February 23, 2023		
Oregon State	78–70	No. 14 Arizona	February 25, 2023		
Wisconsin	78–70	No. 12 Michigan	February 26, 2023		
Clemson	74–61	No. 23 Florida State	February 26, 2023		
**Baylor**	63–54	No. 12 Texas	February 27, 2023		
Kansas	98–93	No. 23 Iowa State	March 1, 2023		
Washington State	66–58	No. 3 Utah	March 2, 2023	Pac-12 tournament	
Washington State	61–49	No. 20 Colorado	March 3, 2023	Pac-12 Tournament	
Louisville	64–38	No. 10 Notre Dame	March 4, 2023	ACC tournament	
Tennessee	69–67	No. 4 LSU	March 4, 2023	SEC tournament	
Washington State	65–61	No. 19 UCLA	March 5, 2023	Pac-12 tournament	
Portland	64–60	No. 16 Gonzaga	March 7, 2023	WCC tournament	
Iowa State	82–72	No. 14 Oklahoma	March 11, 2023	Big 12 tournament	
Iowa State	61–51	No. 15 Texas	March 12, 2023	Big 12 tournament	

In addition to the upsets in which an unranked team defeated a ranked team, this list includes non-Division I teams to defeat Division I teams. Bold type indicates winning teams in "true road games"—i.e., those played on an opponent's home court (including secondary homes).

Winner	Score	Loser	Date	Tournament/event	Notes
**Lenoir–Rhyne** (Division II)	57–46	UNC Wilmington	November 7, 2022		
Alaska-Anchorage (Division II)	64–51	UC Riverside	November 18, 2022	Great Alaska Shootout	
Alaska Anchorage (Division II)	88–75	La Salle	November 19, 2022	Great Alaska Shootout	
**St. Mary's (TX)** (Division II)	66–65	Sam Houston	November 27, 2022		
**St. Francis (IL)** (NAIA)	72–62	Chicago State	January 24, 2023		

=== Conference winners and tournaments ===
Each of the 32 Division I athletic conferences will end its regular season with a single-elimination tournament. The team with the best regular-season record in each conference receives the number one seed in each tournament, with tiebreakers used as needed in the case of ties for the top seeding. Unless otherwise noted, the winners of these tournaments will receive automatic invitations to the 2023 NCAA Division I women's basketball tournament.

Conference	Regular season first place	Conference Player of the year	Conference Coach of the year	Conference tournament	Tournament venue (city)	Tournament winner
America East Conference	Albany; Vermont (Note: Top seed in conference tournament.)	Adrianna Smith, Maine	Alisa Kresge, Vermont	2023 America East women's basketball tournament	Campus sites	Vermont
American Athletic Conference	South Florida	Dulcy Fankam Mendjiadeu & Elena Tsineke, South Florida	Kim McNeill, East Carolina	2023 American Athletic Conference women's basketball tournament	Dickies Arena (Fort Worth, TX)	East Carolina
ASUN Conference	Florida Gulf Coast	Tishara Morehouse, Florida Gulf Coast	Karl Smesko, Florida Gulf Coast	2023 ASUN women's basketball tournament	Campus sites	Florida Gulf Coast
Atlantic 10 Conference	Rhode Island; UMass	Sam Breen, UMass	Tammi Reiss, Rhode Island	2023 Atlantic 10 women's basketball tournament	Chase Fieldhouse (Wilmington, DE)	Saint Louis
Atlantic Coast Conference	Notre Dame	Elizabeth Kitley, Virginia Tech	Niele Ivey, Notre Dame	2023 ACC women's basketball tournament	Greensboro Coliseum (Greensboro, NC)	Virginia Tech
Big 12 Conference	Oklahoma; Texas	Ashley Joens, Iowa State	Vic Schaefer, Texas	2023 Big 12 Conference women's basketball tournament	Municipal Auditorium (Kansas City, MO)	Iowa State
Big East Conference	UConn	Maddy Siegrist, Villanova	Joe Tartamella, St. John's	2023 Big East women's basketball tournament	Mohegan Sun Arena (Uncasville, CT)	UConn
Big Sky Conference	Montana State; Northern Arizona; Sacramento State	Kahlaijah Dean, Sacramento State	Tricia Binford, Montana State; Mark Campbell, Sacramento State; & Loree Payne, Northern Arizona	2023 Big Sky Conference women's basketball tournament	Idaho Central Arena (Boise, ID)	Sacramento State
Big South Conference	Gardner–Webb	Jhessyka Williams, Gardner–Webb	Alex Simmons, Gardner–Webb	2023 Big South Conference women's basketball tournament	Bojangles Coliseum (Charlotte, NC)	Gardner–Webb
Big Ten Conference	Indiana	Caitlin Clark, Iowa	Teri Moren, Indiana	2023 Big Ten women's basketball tournament	Target Center (Minneapolis, MN)	Iowa
Big West Conference	UC Irvine	Tori Harris, Long Beach State	Jeff Cammon, Long Beach State	2023 Big West Conference women's basketball tournament	Dollar Loan Center (Henderson, NV)	Hawai'i
Colonial Athletic Association	Drexel; Northeastern; Towson	Keishana Washington, Drexel	Bridgette Mitchell, Northeastern	2023 CAA women's basketball tournament	SECU Arena (Towson, MD)	Monmouth
Conference USA	Middle Tennessee	Jordyn Jenkins, UTEP	Kevin Baker, UTEP & Rick Insell, Middle Tennessee	2023 Conference USA women's basketball tournament	Ford Center at The Star (Frisco, TX)	Middle Tennessee
Horizon League	Green Bay	Destiny Leo, Cleveland State	Kevin Borseth, Green Bay	2023 Horizon League women's basketball tournament	Quarterfinals: Campus sites Semifinals and final: Indiana Farmers Coliseum (Indianapolis, IN)	Cleveland State
Ivy League	Columbia; Princeton	Kaitlyn Chen, Princeton	Megan Griffith, Columbia	2023 Ivy League women's basketball tournament	Jadwin Gymnasium (Princeton, NJ)	Princeton
Metro Atlantic Athletic Conference	Iona	Juana Camilion, Iona	Billi Chambers, Iona	2023 MAAC women's basketball tournament	Boardwalk Hall (Atlantic City, NJ)	Iona
Mid-American Conference	Toledo	Quinesha Lockett, Toledo	Tricia Cullop, Toledo	2023 Mid-American Conference women's basketball tournament	Rocket Mortgage FieldHouse (Cleveland, OH)	Toledo
Mid-Eastern Athletic Conference	Norfolk State	Destiny Howell, Howard	Larry Vickers, Norfolk State	2023 MEAC women's basketball tournament	Norfolk Scope (Norfolk, VA)	Norfolk State
Missouri Valley Conference	Belmont; Illinois State	Paige Robinson, Illinois State	Kristen Gillespie, Illinois State	2023 Missouri Valley Conference women's basketball tournament	Vibrant Arena at The MARK (Moline, IL)	Drake
Mountain West Conference	UNLV	McKenna Hofschild, Colorado State	Lindy La Rocque, UNLV	2023 Mountain West Conference women's basketball tournament	Thomas and Mack Center (Paradise, NV)	UNLV
Northeast Conference	Fairleigh Dickinson	Ny’Ceara Pryor, Sacred Heart	Angelika Szumilo, Fairleigh Dickinson	2023 Northeast Conference women's basketball tournament	Campus sites	Sacred Heart
Ohio Valley Conference	Little Rock	Sali Kourouma, Little Rock	Joe Foley, Little Rock	2023 Ohio Valley Conference women's basketball tournament	Ford Center (Evansville, IN)	Tennessee Tech
Pac-12 Conference	Stanford; Utah	Alissa Pili, Utah	Lynne Roberts, Utah	2023 Pac-12 Conference women's basketball tournament	Michelob Ultra Arena (Paradise, NV)	Washington State
Patriot League	Boston University	Frannie Hottinger, Lehigh	Melissa Graves, Boston University	2023 Patriot League women's basketball tournament	Campus sites	Holy Cross
Southeastern Conference	South Carolina	Aliyah Boston, South Carolina	Dawn Staley, South Carolina	2023 SEC women's basketball tournament	Bon Secours Wellness Arena (Greenville, SC)	South Carolina
Southern Conference	Wofford	Rachael Rose, Wofford (coaches); Andrea Bailey, Samford (media)	Brenda Mock Brown, East Tennessee State (coaches); Jimmy Garrity, Wofford (media)	2023 Southern Conference women's basketball tournament	Harrah's Cherokee Center (Asheville, NC)	Chattanooga
Southland Conference	Southeastern Louisiana; Texas A&M–Corpus Christi	Alecia Westbrook, Texas A&M–Corpus Christi	Ayla Guzzardo, Southeastern Louisiana	2023 Southland Conference women's basketball tournament	The Legacy Center (Lake Charles, LA)	Southeastern Louisiana
Southwestern Athletic Conference	Jackson State	Ayana Emmanuel, Alabama State	Tomekia Reed, Jackson State	2023 SWAC women's basketball tournament	Bartow Arena (Birmingham, AL)	Southern
Summit League	South Dakota State	Myah Selland, South Dakota State	Aaron Johnston, South Dakota State	2023 Summit League women's basketball tournament	Denny Sanford Premier Center (Sioux Falls, SD)	South Dakota State
Sun Belt Conference	James Madison; Southern Miss; Texas State	Kiki Jefferson, James Madison	Zenarae Antoine, Texas State	2023 Sun Belt Conference women's basketball tournament	Pensacola Bay Center (Pensacola, FL)	James Madison
West Coast Conference	Gonzaga	Kaylynne Truong, Gonzaga	Lisa Fortier, Gonzaga	2023 West Coast Conference women's basketball tournament	Orleans Arena (Paradise, NV) (Note: The first round of the WAC tournament was held at Michelob Ultra Arena, also in the community of Paradise.)	Portland
Western Athletic Conference	Southern Utah	Starr Jacobs, UT Arlington	Tracy Sanders, Southern Utah	2023 WAC women's basketball tournament	Orleans Arena (Paradise, NV)	Southern Utah

=== Statistical leaders ===
Includes postseason games.

**Points per game**			**Rebounds per game**			**Assists per game**			**Steals per game**		
Player	School	PPG	Player	School	RPG	Player	School	APG	Player	School	SPG
Maddy Siegrist	Villanova	29.2	Lauren Gustin	BYU	16.7	Caitlin Clark	Iowa	8.6	Ny'Ceara Pryor	Sacred Heart	3.70
Caitlin Clark	Iowa	27.8	Angel Reese	LSU	15.4	Nika Mühl	UConn	7.9	Aaliyah Parker	Niagara	3.66
Keishana Washington	Drexel	27.7	Taiyanna Jackson	Kansas	12.7	Maura Henderson	Drexel	7.8	Asiah Dingle	Fordham	3.91
Aneesah Morrow	DePaul	25.7	A'Jah Davis	Northern Illinois	12.4	Rori Harmon	Texas	7.4	Alasia Smith	Gardner–Webb	3.41
Angel Reese	LSU	23.0	Dulcy Fankam Mendjiadeu	South Florida	12.3	McKenna Hofschild	Colorado State	7.2	Camille Downs	Norfolk State	3.41

**Blocked shots per game**			**Field goal percentage**			**Three-point field goal percentage**			**Free throw percentage**		
Player	School	BPG	Player	School	FG%	Player	School	3FG%	Player	School	FT%
Brooke Flowers	Saint Louis	3.80	Mya Berkman	Liberty	69.50	Alex Giannaros	Boston University	51.55	Erin Houpt	Mercer	93.88
Rayah Marshall	USC	3.50	Mackenzie Holmes	Indiana	68.04	Brynna Maxwell	Gonzaga	48.07	Maddie Scherr	Kentucky	91.95
Cameron Brink	Stanford	3.47	Monika Czinano	Iowa	67.41	Kate Mager	Iona	47.71	Abbey Ellis	Purdue	91.67
Emma Merriweather	ULM	3.21	Taiyanna Jackson	Kansas	66.09	Yarden Garzon	Indiana	45.75	Margaret Whitley	UAB	91.51
Promise Taylor	Southern Illinois	3.06	Isnelle Natabou	Sacramento State	64.24	Mercedes Staples	San Diego State	45.52	Sydney Wagner	William & Mary	91.26

== Postseason ==
=== Tournament upsets ===
Per the NCAA, "Upsets are defined as when the winner of the game was seeded two or more places lower than the team it defeated." The 2023 tournament has nine upsets so far, with five in the first round, three in the second round, and one in the Sweet Sixteen. Stanford's loss to Ole Miss marked the first time a No. 1 seed failed to make the Sweet Sixteen since 2009. With Indiana's loss to Miami, this marked the first time two No. 1 seeds failed to make the Sweet Sixteen since 1998.

Round	Greenville 1	Seattle 4	Greenville 2	Seattle 3
First round	No. 11 Mississippi State defeated No. 6 Creighton, 79–64.	No. 10 Georgia defeated No. 7 Florida State, 66–54.	No. 12 Florida Gulf Coast defeated No. 5 Washington State, 74–63.; No. 10 Princeton defeated No. 7 NC State, 64–63.	No. 12 Toledo defeated No. 5 Iowa State, 80–73.
Second Round	None	No. 8 Ole Miss defeated No. 1 Stanford, 54–49.; No. 6 Colorado defeated No. 3 Duke, 61–53 in OT.	No. 9 Miami (FL) defeated No. 1 Indiana, 70–68.	None
Sweet 16	None	None	No. 9 Miami (FL) defeated No. 4 Villanova, 70–65.	None
Elite 8	None		None	
Final 4				

=== Final Four – American Airlines Center, Dallas, Texas ===
National semifinals Final Four; Friday, March 31
GR1(1)	South Carolina	73
SR4(2)	Iowa	77
GR2(3)	LSU	79
SR3(1)	Virginia Tech	72

National Championship; Sunday, April 2
SR4(2)	Iowa	85
GR2(3)	LSU	102

=== Women's National Invitation Tournament ===
Semifinals; March 28–29
Washington	36
(H)	Kansas	61
Columbia	77
(H)	Bowling Green	70

Championship; April 1 CBSSN
(H)	Kansas	66
Columbia	59

=== Women's Basketball Invitational ===
This season saw the debut of a third national postseason tournament in the Women's Basketball Invitational, a 16-team affair with all games played on home courts.

Semifinals; March 18
East Tennessee State	53
New Mexico State	57
Georgia Southern	80
Cal Baptist	82

Championship; March 19
New Mexico State	61
Cal Baptist	63

== Conference standings ==
2022–23 America East Conference women's basketball standings
	Conf.				Overall
Team	W		L	PCT	W		L	PCT
Vermont†	14	–	2	.875	25	–	7	.781
Albany	14	–	2	.875	22	–	12	.647
Maine	11	–	5	.688	16	–	14	.533
UMBC	10	–	6	.625	14	–	15	.483
NJIT	8	–	8	.500	13	–	16	.448
Binghamton	6	–	10	.375	13	–	17	.433
UMass Lowell	4	–	12	.250	5	–	22	.185
Bryant	3	–	13	.188	9	–	21	.300
New Hampshire	2	–	14	.125	7	–	21	.250
† 2023 AmEast Tournament winner As of March 17, 2023

2022–23 American Athletic Conference women's basketball standings
	Conf.				Overall
Team	W		L	PCT	W		L	PCT
South Florida	15	–	1	.938	27	–	7	.794
Memphis	11	–	4	.733	22	–	11	.667
East Carolina †	11	–	5	.688	23	–	9	.719
Houston	10	–	5	.667	15	–	16	.484
SMU	7	–	8	.467	17	–	12	.586
Tulane	7	–	9	.438	18	–	14	.563
Tulsa	7	–	9	.438	17	–	13	.567
Wichita State	6	–	10	.375	18	–	15	.545
Temple	6	–	10	.375	11	–	18	.379
UCF	4	–	11	.267	14	–	15	.483
Cincinnati	2	–	14	.125	9	–	21	.300
† 2023 AAC tournament winner As of March 24, 2023; Rankings from AP poll Source: The American

2022–23 Atlantic 10 women's basketball standings
	Conf.				Overall
Team	W		L	PCT	W		L	PCT
Rhode Island	14	–	2	.875	26	–	7	.788
UMass	14	–	2	.875	27	–	7	.794
Fordham	10	–	6	.625	19	–	13	.594
Saint Louis†	10	–	6	.625	17	–	18	.486
Richmond	8	–	6	.571	21	–	11	.656
Saint Joseph's	9	–	7	.563	20	–	11	.645
George Washington	9	–	7	.563	18	–	13	.581
La Salle	8	–	7	.533	17	–	14	.548
Duquesne	8	–	8	.500	19	–	12	.613
George Mason	8	–	8	.500	16	–	15	.516
Davidson	6	–	8	.429	14	–	16	.467
Dayton	5	–	10	.333	7	–	21	.250
VCU	4	–	12	.250	7	–	22	.241
St. Bonaventure	3	–	13	.188	6	–	26	.188
Loyola Chicago	1	–	15	.063	6	–	24	.200
† 2023 A10 Tournament winner As of March 24, 2023

2022–23 ACC women's basketball standings
	Conf.				Overall
Team	W		L	PCT	W		L	PCT
No. 10т Notre Dame	15	–	3	.833	27	–	6	.818
No. 13 Duke	14	–	4	.778	26	–	7	.788
No. 4 Virginia Tech †	14	–	4	.778	31	–	4	.886
Louisville	12	–	6	.667	26	–	12	.684
Florida State	12	–	6	.667	23	–	10	.697
Miami (FL)	11	–	7	.611	22	–	13	.629
No. 20 North Carolina	11	–	7	.611	22	–	11	.667
NC State	9	–	9	.500	20	–	12	.625
Syracuse	9	–	9	.500	20	–	13	.606
Clemson	7	–	11	.389	19	–	16	.543
Boston College	5	–	13	.278	16	–	17	.485
Wake Forest	5	–	13	.278	17	–	17	.500
Virginia	4	–	14	.222	15	–	15	.500
Georgia Tech	4	–	14	.222	13	–	17	.433
Pittsburgh	3	–	15	.167	10	–	20	.333
† 2023 ACC tournament winner As of March 27, 2023; Rankings from AP poll

2022–23 ASUN women's basketball standings
	Conf.				Overall
Team	W		L	PCT	W		L	PCT
Florida Gulf Coast†	17	–	1	.944	33	–	4	.892
Liberty	16	–	2	.889	24	–	9	.727
Lipscomb	13	–	5	.722	20	–	12	.625
Austin Peay	12	–	6	.667	17	–	12	.586
Eastern Kentucky	11	–	7	.611	18	–	14	.563
Kennesaw State	10	–	8	.556	15	–	16	.484
North Alabama	10	–	8	.556	15	–	15	.500
Jacksonville State	9	–	9	.500	16	–	14	.533
Stetson	6	–	12	.333	13	–	20	.394
Jacksonville	6	–	12	.333	12	–	17	.414
North Florida	5	–	13	.278	8	–	20	.286
Bellarmine*	5	–	13	.278	9	–	22	.290
Central Arkansas	3	–	15	.167	8	–	21	.276
Queens*	3	–	15	.167	8	–	21	.276
† 2023 ASUN Tournament winner As of March 20, 2023

2022–23 Big 12 Conference women's basketball standings
	Conf.				Overall
Team	W		L	PCT	W		L	PCT
No. 15 Texas	14	–	4	.778	26	–	10	.722
No. 16 Oklahoma	14	–	4	.778	26	–	7	.788
No. 17 Iowa State†	11	–	7	.611	22	–	10	.688
Oklahoma State	10	–	8	.556	21	–	12	.636
West Virginia	10	–	8	.556	19	–	12	.613
Baylor	10	–	8	.556	20	–	13	.606
Kansas	9	–	9	.500	22	–	11	.667
Texas Tech	6	–	12	.333	20	–	15	.571
Kansas State	5	–	13	.278	19	–	16	.543
TCU	1	–	17	.056	8	–	23	.258
† 2023 Big 12 Tournament winner As of March 24, 2023; Rankings from AP poll

2022–23 Big East women's basketball standings
	Conf.				Overall
Team	W		L	PCT	W		L	PCT
No. 6 UConn†	18	–	2	.900	31	–	6	.838
No. 10т Villanova	17	–	3	.850	30	–	7	.811
Creighton	15	–	5	.750	22	–	9	.710
St. John's	13	–	7	.650	23	–	9	.719
Marquette	13	–	7	.650	21	–	11	.656
Seton Hall	10	–	10	.500	19	–	14	.576
DePaul	8	–	12	.400	16	–	17	.485
Georgetown	6	–	14	.300	14	–	17	.452
Butler	6	–	14	.300	11	–	19	.367
Providence	4	–	16	.200	13	–	19	.406
Xavier	0	–	20	.000	7	–	23	.233
† 2023 Big East tournament winner As of March 24, 2023; Rankings from AP poll

2022–23 Big Sky women's basketball standings
	Conf.				Overall
Team	W		L	PCT	W		L	PCT
Sacramento State†	13	–	5	.722	25	–	7	.781
Montana State	13	–	5	.722	20	–	11	.645
Northern Arizona	13	–	5	.722	21	–	14	.600
Eastern Washington	11	–	7	.611	19	–	11	.633
Montana	10	–	8	.556	14	–	16	.467
Idaho	9	–	9	.500	13	–	17	.433
Portland State	8	–	10	.444	15	–	16	.484
Idaho State	6	–	12	.333	11	–	19	.367
Northern Colorado	5	–	13	.278	13	–	18	.419
Weber State	2	–	16	.111	6	–	25	.194
† 2023 Big Sky tournament winner As of March 17, 2023

2022–23 Big South women's basketball standings
	Conf.				Overall
Team	W		L	PCT	W		L	PCT
Gardner–Webb†	18	–	0	1.000	29	–	5	.853
High Point	13	–	5	.722	17	–	15	.531
Campbell	10	–	8	.556	16	–	15	.516
Presbyterian	9	–	9	.500	13	–	17	.433
Radford	9	–	9	.500	14	–	17	.452
Longwood	8	–	10	.444	9	–	21	.300
UNC Asheville	7	–	11	.389	12	–	19	.387
USC Upstate	7	–	11	.389	11	–	20	.355
Winthrop	6	–	12	.333	8	–	22	.267
Charleston Southern	3	–	15	.167	5	–	25	.167
† 2023 Big South tournament winner As of March 17, 2023

2022–23 Big Ten women's basketball standings
	Conf.				Overall
Team	W		L	PCT	W		L	PCT
No. 2 Indiana	16	–	2	.889	28	–	4	.875
No. 3 Iowa †	15	–	3	.833	31	–	7	.816
No. 7 Maryland	15	–	3	.833	28	–	7	.800
No. 12 Ohio State	12	–	6	.667	28	–	8	.778
No. 18 Michigan	11	–	7	.611	23	–	10	.697
Illinois	11	–	7	.611	22	–	10	.688
Purdue	9	–	8	.529	19	–	11	.633
Nebraska	8	–	10	.444	18	–	15	.545
Michigan State	7	–	10	.412	16	–	14	.533
Wisconsin	6	–	12	.333	11	–	20	.355
Rutgers	5	–	13	.278	12	–	20	.375
Minnesota	4	–	14	.222	11	–	19	.367
Penn State	4	–	14	.222	14	–	17	.452
Northwestern	2	–	16	.111	9	–	21	.300
† 2023 Big Ten tournament winner As of April 2, 2023; Rankings from AP poll

2022–23 Big West women's basketball standings
	Conf.				Overall
Team	W		L	PCT	W		L	PCT
UC Irvine	16	–	2	.889	25	–	7	.781
Long Beach State	17	–	3	.850	23	–	10	.697
Hawai'i†	13	–	7	.650	18	–	15	.545
UC Davis	12	–	7	.632	16	–	14	.533
UC Santa Barbara	12	–	8	.600	21	–	12	.636
UC San Diego*	10	–	10	.500	13	–	17	.433
Cal State Fullerton	9	–	11	.450	14	–	16	.467
Cal Poly	7	–	12	.368	10	–	18	.357
Cal State Northridge	6	–	14	.300	7	–	24	.226
Cal State Bakersfield	3	–	17	.150	8	–	23	.258
UC Riverside	3	–	17	.150	6	–	26	.188
† 2023 Big West tournament winner * ineligible for the 2023 NCAA tournament due to transition period As of March 20, 2023

2022–23 CAA women's basketball standings
	Conf.				Overall
Team	W		L	PCT	W		L	PCT
Towson	13	–	5	.722	21	–	11	.656
Drexel	13	–	5	.722	21	–	10	.677
Northeastern	13	–	5	.722	19	–	12	.613
William & Mary	12	–	6	.667	18	–	13	.581
North Carolina A&T	12	–	6	.667	18	–	12	.600
Stony Brook	11	–	7	.611	18	–	13	.581
Monmouth †	9	–	9	.500	18	–	16	.529
Delaware	9	–	9	.500	16	–	14	.533
Hampton	8	–	10	.444	12	–	18	.400
Charleston	6	–	12	.333	11	–	18	.379
Elon	5	–	13	.278	9	–	21	.300
Hofstra	4	–	14	.222	12	–	20	.375
UNC Wilmington	2	–	16	.111	5	–	25	.167
† 2023 CAA tournament winner As of March 17, 2023; Rankings from AP poll

2022–23 Conference USA women's basketball standings
	Conf.				Overall
Team	W		L	PCT	W		L	PCT
Middle Tennessee†	18	–	2	.900	28	–	5	.848
Western Kentucky	14	–	6	.700	19	–	14	.576
Rice	13	–	7	.650	23	–	9	.719
UTEP	12	–	8	.600	20	–	12	.625
Louisiana Tech	12	–	8	.600	19	–	13	.594
UTSA	9	–	11	.450	13	–	19	.406
North Texas	8	–	12	.400	11	–	20	.355
FIU	7	–	13	.350	14	–	19	.424
Charlotte	7	–	13	.350	12	–	19	.387
UAB	5	–	15	.250	14	–	17	.452
Florida Atlantic	5	–	15	.250	12	–	18	.400
† 2023 C-USA tournament winner As of March 19, 2023

2022–23 Horizon League women's basketball standings
	Conf.				Overall
Team	W		L	PCT	W		L	PCT
Green Bay	18	–	2	.900	28	–	5	.848
Cleveland State†	17	–	3	.850	30	–	4	.882
IUPUI	13	–	7	.650	17	–	13	.567
Youngstown State	13	–	7	.650	19	–	11	.633
Northern Kentucky	10	–	10	.500	17	–	14	.548
Purdue Fort Wayne	9	–	11	.450	14	–	19	.424
Oakland	8	–	12	.400	13	–	17	.433
Milwaukee	8	–	12	.400	11	–	19	.367
Wright State	6	–	14	.300	8	–	24	.250
Robert Morris	5	–	15	.250	11	–	19	.367
Detroit Mercy	3	–	17	.150	5	–	25	.167
† 2023 Horizon League Tournament winner As of March 17, 2023

2022–23 Ivy League women's basketball standings
	Conf.				Overall
Team	W		L	PCT	W		L	PCT
Columbia	12	–	2	.857	26	–	5	.839
Princeton†	12	–	2	.857	24	–	6	.800
Harvard	9	–	5	.643	20	–	11	.645
Penn	9	–	5	.643	17	–	12	.586
Yale	7	–	7	.500	13	–	14	.481
Brown	4	–	10	.286	11	–	15	.423
Cornell	3	–	11	.214	10	–	17	.370
Dartmouth	0	–	14	.000	2	–	26	.071
† 2023 Ivy League tournament winner As of March 24, 2023

2022–23 MAAC women's basketball standings
	Conf.				Overall
Team	W		L	PCT	W		L	PCT
Iona†	18	–	2	.900	26	–	6	.813
Quinnipiac	16	–	4	.800	21	–	9	.700
Niagara	16	–	4	.800	18	–	13	.581
Siena	12	–	8	.600	19	–	13	.594
Fairfield	11	–	9	.550	15	–	15	.500
Manhattan	10	–	10	.500	16	–	17	.485
Marist	8	–	12	.400	12	–	18	.400
Mount St. Mary's	7	–	13	.350	12	–	19	.387
Canisius	6	–	14	.300	9	–	21	.300
Rider	6	–	14	.300	10	–	21	.323
Saint Peter's	0	–	20	.000	0	–	30	.000
† 2023 MAAC tournament winner As of March 17, 2023

2022–23 Mid-American Conference women's basketball standings
	Conf.				Overall
Team	W		L	PCT	W		L	PCT
Toledo†	16	–	2	.889	29	–	5	.853
Bowling Green	14	–	4	.778	30	–	6	.833
Ball State	14	–	4	.778	26	–	8	.765
Kent State	12	–	6	.667	21	–	11	.656
Akron	8	–	10	.444	17	–	13	.567
Northern Illinois	8	–	10	.444	16	–	17	.485
Eastern Michigan	7	–	11	.389	15	–	15	.500
Buffalo	7	–	11	.389	12	–	16	.429
Western Michigan	7	–	11	.389	12	–	17	.414
Miami (OH)	7	–	11	.389	12	–	19	.387
Central Michigan	4	–	14	.222	6	–	23	.207
Ohio	4	–	14	.222	6	–	23	.207
† 2023 MAC tournament winner As of March 24, 2023

2022–23 MEAC women's basketball standings
	Conf.				Overall
Team	W		L	PCT	W		L	PCT
Norfolk State †	11	–	3	.786	26	–	7	.788
Morgan State	10	–	4	.714	17	–	12	.586
Howard	10	–	4	.714	16	–	14	.533
North Carolina Central	8	–	6	.571	15	–	16	.484
Maryland Eastern Shore	5	–	9	.357	10	–	20	.333
Delaware State	5	–	9	.357	7	–	19	.269
Coppin State	5	–	9	.357	8	–	22	.267
South Carolina State	2	–	12	.143	3	–	27	.100
† 2023 MEAC tournament winner As of March 17, 2023

2022–23 Missouri Valley Conference women's basketball standings
	Conf.				Overall
Team	W		L	PCT	W		L	PCT
Illinois State	17	–	3	.850	24	–	9	.727
Belmont	17	–	3	.850	23	–	12	.657
Northern Iowa	16	–	4	.800	23	–	10	.697
Missouri State	14	–	6	.700	20	–	12	.625
Drake†	14	–	6	.700	22	–	9	.710
UIC	9	–	11	.450	19	–	17	.528
Southern Illinois	8	–	12	.400	12	–	19	.387
Murray State	7	–	13	.350	15	–	16	.484
Evansville	6	–	14	.300	11	–	19	.367
Indiana State	6	–	14	.300	11	–	19	.367
Valparaiso	5	–	15	.250	7	–	23	.233
Bradley	1	–	19	.050	4	–	28	.125
† 2023 MVC tournament winner As of March 19, 2023

2022–23 Mountain West Conference women's basketball standings
	Conf.				Overall
Team	W		L	PCT	W		L	PCT
No. 22 UNLV†	18	–	0	1.000	31	–	3	.912
Wyoming	13	–	5	.722	23	–	11	.676
San Diego State	12	–	6	.667	23	–	11	.676
Colorado State	12	–	6	.667	20	–	12	.625
New Mexico	12	–	6	.667	21	–	12	.636
Boise State	11	–	7	.611	17	–	16	.515
Air Force	8	–	10	.444	13	–	18	.419
Nevada	6	–	12	.333	10	–	21	.323
Fresno State	3	–	15	.167	10	–	22	.313
San Jose State	3	–	15	.167	6	–	25	.194
Utah State	1	–	17	.056	4	–	26	.133
† 2023 MW Tournament winner As of March 21, 2023; Rankings from AP poll

2022–23 NCAA Division I women's basketball independents standings
	Conf.				Overall
Team	W		L	PCT	W		L	PCT
Chicago State	0	–	0	–	6	–	22	.214
Hartford	0	–	0	–	2	–	26	.071
As of March 5, 2023; Rankings from AP Poll

2022–23 Northeast Conference women's basketball standings
	Conf.				Overall
Team	W		L	PCT	W		L	PCT
Fairleigh Dickinson	14	–	2	.875	24	–	8	.750
Sacred Heart†	12	–	4	.750	19	–	14	.576
Merrimack*	10	–	6	.625	15	–	16	.484
St. Francis Brooklyn	9	–	7	.563	11	–	19	.367
Wagner	8	–	8	.500	13	–	15	.464
Saint Francis (PA)	6	–	10	.375	7	–	22	.241
Stonehill*	5	–	11	.313	9	–	20	.310
LIU	5	–	11	.313	7	–	22	.241
Central Connecticut	3	–	13	.188	7	–	22	.241
† 2023 NEC tournament winner * ineligible for the 2023 NCAA tournament due to transition period As of March 17, 2023

2022–23 Ohio Valley Conference women's basketball standings
	Conf.				Overall
Team	W		L	PCT	W		L	PCT
Little Rock	17	–	1	.944	21	–	10	.677
Eastern Illinois	14	–	4	.778	21	–	8	.724
Tennessee Tech†	13	–	5	.722	22	–	9	.710
Southeast Missouri State	10	–	8	.556	16	–	15	.516
UT Martin	9	–	9	.500	13	–	17	.433
Tennessee State	7	–	11	.389	11	–	18	.379
SIU Edwardsville	7	–	11	.389	9	–	22	.290
Morehead State	6	–	12	.333	11	–	20	.355
Southern Indiana*	6	–	12	.333	12	–	17	.414
Lindenwood*	1	–	17	.056	2	–	24	.077
† 2023 OVC tournament winner * ineligible for the 2023 NCAA tournament due to transition period As of March 5, 2023

2022–23 Pac-12 Conference women's basketball standings
	Conf.				Overall
Team	W		L	PCT	W		L	PCT
No. 8 Utah	15	–	3	.833	27	–	5	.844
No. 5 Stanford	15	–	3	.833	29	–	6	.829
No. 21 Colorado	13	–	5	.722	25	–	9	.735
No. 14 UCLA	11	–	7	.611	27	–	10	.730
No. 25 Arizona	11	–	7	.611	22	–	10	.688
USC	11	–	7	.611	21	–	10	.677
No. 23 Washington State †	9	–	9	.500	23	–	11	.676
Oregon	7	–	11	.389	20	–	15	.571
Washington	7	–	11	.389	19	–	15	.559
California	4	–	14	.222	13	–	17	.433
Oregon State	4	–	14	.222	13	–	18	.419
Arizona State	1	–	17	.056	8	–	20	.286
† 2023 Pac-12 Tournament winner Rankings from AP poll

2022–23 Patriot League women's basketball standings
	Conf.				Overall
Team	W		L	PCT	W		L	PCT
Boston University	17	–	1	.944	24	–	9	.727
Holy Cross†	13	–	5	.722	24	–	8	.750
Lehigh	12	–	6	.667	17	–	14	.548
Colgate	10	–	8	.556	16	–	14	.533
Army	10	–	8	.556	13	–	17	.433
Bucknell	9	–	9	.500	13	–	17	.433
Lafayette	7	–	11	.389	10	–	19	.345
American	7	–	11	.389	9	–	22	.290
Loyola	4	–	14	.222	10	–	21	.323
Navy	1	–	17	.056	1	–	29	.033
† 2023 Patriot League tournament winner As of March 11, 2023

2022–23 SEC women's basketball standings
	Conf.				Overall
Team	W		L	PCT	W		L	PCT
No. 1 South Carolina†	16	–	0	1.000	36	–	1	.973
No. 9 LSU	15	–	1	.938	34	–	2	.944
No. 24 Tennessee	13	–	3	.813	25	–	12	.676
Ole Miss	11	–	5	.688	25	–	9	.735
Mississippi State	9	–	7	.563	22	–	11	.667
Georgia	9	–	7	.563	22	–	12	.647
Alabama	9	–	7	.563	20	–	11	.645
Arkansas	7	–	9	.438	24	–	13	.649
Missouri	6	–	10	.375	18	–	14	.563
Florida	5	–	11	.313	19	–	14	.576
Auburn	5	–	11	.313	16	–	15	.516
Vanderbilt	3	–	13	.188	12	–	19	.387
Kentucky	2	–	14	.125	12	–	19	.387
Texas A&M	2	–	14	.125	9	–	20	.310
† 2023 SEC tournament winner As of April 2, 2023; Rankings from AP poll

2022–23 SWAC women's basketball standings
	Conf.				Overall
Team	W		L	PCT	W		L	PCT
Jackson State	17	–	1	.944	21	–	9	.700
Alabama State	12	–	6	.667	16	–	15	.516
Alabama A&M	12	–	6	.667	14	–	15	.483
Prairie View A&M	12	–	6	.667	15	–	15	.500
Southern†	12	–	6	.667	18	–	14	.563
Arkansas–Pine Bluff	10	–	8	.556	14	–	17	.452
Bethune–Cookman	10	–	8	.556	11	–	18	.379
Grambling State	9	–	9	.500	10	–	20	.333
Alcorn State	8	–	10	.444	12	–	17	.414
Florida A&M	4	–	14	.222	6	–	23	.207
Texas Southern	2	–	16	.111	2	–	27	.069
Mississippi Valley State	0	–	18	.000	2	–	27	.069
† 2023 SWAC tournament winner As of March 11, 2023

2022–23 Southern Conference women's basketball standings
	Conf.				Overall
Team	W		L	PCT	W		L	PCT
Wofford	10	–	4	.714	22	–	10	.688
Chattanooga†	9	–	5	.643	20	–	13	.606
East Tennessee State	9	–	5	.643	26	–	10	.722
Mercer	8	–	6	.571	12	–	16	.429
UNC Greensboro	8	–	6	.571	16	–	14	.533
Samford	7	–	7	.500	13	–	17	.433
Furman	3	–	11	.214	11	–	19	.367
Western Carolina	2	–	12	.143	9	–	21	.300
† 2023 SoCon Tournament winner As of March 19, 2023

2022–23 Southland Conference women's basketball standings
	Conf.				Overall
Team	W		L	PCT	W		L	PCT
Southeastern Louisiana †	14	–	4	.778	21	–	10	.677
Texas A&M–Corpus Christi	14	–	4	.778	19	–	12	.613
Lamar	12	–	6	.667	20	–	12	.625
Incarnate Word	10	–	8	.556	15	–	14	.517
Texas A&M–Commerce*	10	–	8	.556	14	–	19	.424
McNeese	8	–	10	.444	12	–	19	.387
New Orleans	7	–	11	.389	8	–	20	.286
Northwestern State	7	–	11	.389	11	–	18	.379
Houston Christian	6	–	12	.333	11	–	18	.379
Nicholls	2	–	16	.111	5	–	24	.172
† 2023 Southland tournament winner * ineligible for the 2023 NCAA tournament due to transition period As of March 18, 2023

2022–23 Summit League women's basketball standings
	Conf.				Overall
Team	W		L	PCT	W		L	PCT
South Dakota State †	18	–	0	1.000	29	–	6	.829
North Dakota State	12	–	6	.667	18	–	12	.600
North Dakota	11	–	7	.611	19	–	13	.594
South Dakota	10	–	8	.556	14	–	16	.467
Oral Roberts	8	–	10	.444	12	–	19	.387
Omaha	8	–	10	.444	15	–	17	.469
Denver	8	–	10	.444	12	–	18	.400
St. Thomas*	7	–	11	.389	13	–	17	.433
Western Illinois	5	–	13	.278	10	–	20	.333
Kansas City	3	–	15	.167	9	–	23	.281
† 2023 Summit League Tournament winner * Ineligible for the 2023 NCAA tournament due to transition from Division III; As of March 19, 2023

2022–23 Sun Belt Conference women's basketball standings
	Conf.				Overall
Team	W		L	PCT	W		L	PCT
James Madison †	13	–	5	.722	27	–	8	.771
Texas State	13	–	5	.722	24	–	10	.706
Southern Miss	13	–	5	.722	21	–	10	.677
Georgia Southern	12	–	6	.667	21	–	10	.677
Old Dominion	12	–	6	.667	22	–	13	.629
Troy	12	–	6	.667	17	–	13	.567
Louisiana	10	–	8	.556	22	–	21	.512
Marshall	9	–	9	.500	17	–	14	.548
Coastal Carolina	9	–	9	.500	14	–	17	.452
Arkansas State	6	–	12	.333	13	–	19	.406
Appalachian State	6	–	12	.333	11	–	20	.355
Georgia State	5	–	13	.278	12	–	21	.364
Louisiana–Monroe	3	–	15	.167	7	–	23	.233
South Alabama	3	–	15	.167	7	–	23	.233
† 2023 Sun Belt tournament winner

2022–23 WAC women's basketball standings
	Conf.				Overall
Team	W		L	PCT	W		L	PCT
Southern Utah†	16	–	2	.889	23	–	10	.697
Stephen F. Austin	15	–	3	.833	26	–	6	.813
California Baptist	13	–	5	.722	22	–	13	.629
Grand Canyon	12	–	6	.667	21	–	10	.677
Utah Tech*	10	–	8	.556	19	–	12	.613
New Mexico State	10	–	8	.556	18	–	17	.514
Abilene Christian	9	–	9	.500	15	–	15	.500
UT Arlington	8	–	10	.444	14	–	17	.452
Sam Houston	8	–	10	.444	13	–	17	.433
UT Rio Grande Valley	6	–	12	.333	12	–	18	.400
Seattle	5	–	13	.278	6	–	24	.200
Utah Valley	3	–	15	.167	6	–	24	.200
Tarleton*	2	–	16	.111	8	–	21	.276
† 2023 WAC tournament winner * Ineligible for the 2023 NCAA tournament due to transition from Division II; As of March 18, 2023

2022–23 West Coast Conference women's basketball standings
	Conf.				Overall
Team	W		L	PCT	W		L	PCT
No. 19 Gonzaga	17	–	1	.944	28	–	5	.848
Portland†	15	–	3	.833	23	–	9	.719
San Diego	11	–	7	.611	19	–	14	.576
BYU	9	–	9	.500	16	–	17	.485
San Francisco	9	–	9	.500	19	–	13	.594
Pacific	8	–	10	.444	15	–	17	.469
Saint Mary's	6	–	12	.333	13	–	18	.419
Santa Clara	6	–	12	.333	15	–	17	.469
Pepperdine	5	–	13	.278	11	–	19	.367
Loyola Marymount	4	–	14	.222	7	–	23	.233
† 2023 WCC tournament winner As of March 24, 2023; Rankings from AP poll

== Award winners ==
=== All-America teams ===
The NCAA has never recognized a consensus All-America team in women's basketball. This differs from the practice in men's basketball, in which the NCAA uses a combination of selections by the Associated Press (AP), the National Association of Basketball Coaches (NABC), the Sporting News, and the United States Basketball Writers Association (USBWA) to determine a consensus All-America team. The selection of a consensus team is possible because all four organizations select at least a first and second team, with only the USBWA not selecting a third team.

Before the 2017–18 season, it was impossible for a consensus women's All-America team to be determined because the AP had been the only body that divided its women's selections into separate teams. The USBWA first named separate teams in 2017–18. The women's counterpart to the NABC, the Women's Basketball Coaches Association (WBCA), continues the USBWA's former practice of selecting a single ten-member (plus ties) team. The NCAA does not recognize Sporting News as an All-America selector in women's basketball.

=== Major player of the year awards ===
- Wooden Award: Caitlin Clark, Iowa
- Naismith Award: Caitlin Clark, Iowa
- Associated Press Player of the Year: Caitlin Clark, Iowa
- Wade Trophy: Caitlin Clark, Iowa
- Ann Meyers Drysdale Women's Player of the Year (USBWA): Caitlin Clark, Iowa

=== Major freshman of the year awards ===
- Tamika Catchings Award (USBWA): Ta'Niya Latson, Florida State
- WBCA Freshman of the Year:Ta'Niya Latson, Florida State

=== Major coach of the year awards ===
- Associated Press Coach of the Year: Teri Moren, Indiana
- Naismith College Coach of the Year: Dawn Staley, South Carolina
- USBWA National Coach of the Year: Dawn Staley, South Carolina
- WBCA National Coach of the Year: Dawn Staley, South Carolina
- WBCA Assistant Coach of the Year: Jan Jensen, Iowa

=== Other major awards ===
- Naismith Starting Five:
  - Nancy Lieberman Award (top point guard): Caitlin Clark, Iowa
  - Ann Meyers Drysdale Award (top shooting guard): Zia Cooke, South Carolina
  - Cheryl Miller Award (top small forward): Ashley Joens, Iowa State
  - Katrina McClain Award (top power forward): Maddy Siegrist, Villanova
  - Lisa Leslie Award (top center): Aliyah Boston, South Carolina
- WBCA Defensive Player of the Year: Cameron Brink, Stanford
- Naismith Women's Defensive Player of the Year: Aliyah Boston, South Carolina
- Becky Hammon Mid-Major Player of the Year Award: Sam Breen, UMass
- Maggie Dixon Award (top rookie head coach): Shawn Poppie, Chattanooga
- Academic All-American of the Year (top scholar-athlete): Caitlin Clark, Iowa
- Elite 90 Award (top GPA among upperclass players at Final Four): Sharon Goodman, Iowa
- Pat Summitt Most Courageous Award: Angelique Francis, Little Rock

== Coaching changes ==
Many teams changed coaches during and after the season.

Team	Former coach	Interim coach	New coach	Reason
Akron	Melissa Jackson		Ryan Gensler	Akron announced on February 21, 2023, that Jackson's contract would not be renewed at the end of the season, ending her 5-year tenure. Illinois assistant coach Gensler was hired by the Zips on March 29.
Bowling Green	Robyn Fralick		Fred Chmiel	Fralick departed Bowling Green on March 31, 2023, after five seasons for the Michigan State job. Fred Chmiel, who won 2 national titles on Dawn Staley's staff at South Carolina, was hired by the Falcons on April 8.
Bryant	Mary Burke		Lynne-Ann Kokoski	Burke, citing a desire to pursue other opportunities, announced she was stepping down as head coach on March 6, 2023, after 32 seasons at Bryant. UMass assistant Kokoski, a former Bryant player and assistant coach under Burke, was hired by the Bulldogs on April 14.
Central Arkansas	Sandra Rushing		Tony Kemper	Rushing announced her resignation from Central Arkansas after eleven seasons on February 25, 2023, citing her ongoing care for her ailing mother, having missed eight games during the 2022–23 season due to her care obligations. Rushing left with 587 wins as a head coach, 184 of them at UCA. Former Sugar Bear assistant coach and current Marshall head coach Kemper was hired on March 10.
Central Connecticut	Kerri Reaves		Way Veney	Reaves announced her resignation from Central Connecticut on March 10, 2023, after three seasons. Temple associate head coach Veney was hired by the Blue Devils on April 28.
Central Michigan	Heather Oesterle		Kristin Haynie	CMU parted ways with Oesterle on April 6, 2023, after four seasons. Recently hired Minnesota Lynx assistant coach and former Chippewa assistant coach Haynie was hired on April 20.
Cincinnati	Michelle Clark-Heard		Katrina Merriweather	Cincinnati announced on March 7, 2023, that they had parted ways with Clark-Heard after five seasons. Memphis head coach and former Bearcat player and captain Merriweather was hired as her replacement on March 25.
Dartmouth	Adrienne Shibles		Linda Cimino	After two seasons at Dartmouth, Shibles stepped down from her head coaching position on April 17, 2023. Cimino, who was head coach at St. Francis Brooklyn for the past five seasons before the school eliminated their entire athletic program this spring, was hired by the Big Green on May 23.
East Tennessee State	Simon Harris		Brenda Mock Brown	ETSU fired Harris on August 1, 2022 (effective August 15) after one season following alleged Title IX violations against him by former players. Former UNC Asheville head coach Brenda Mock Brown was hired by the Buccaneers on August 8.
Fairleigh Dickinson	Angelika Szumilo		Stephanie Gaitley	Szumilo left FDU on April 17, 2023, after four seasons for the Iona job. Stephanie Gaitley, head coach at 5 previous schools (most recently Fordham), was hired by the Knights on April 21.
Florida A&M	Shalon Pillow		Bridgette Gordon	Pillow announced her resignation from FAMU on July 6, 2023 (effective August 1) after two seasons. On July 28, the Rattlers hired Bridgette Gordon, who had been hired as assistant coach by New Mexico State a month prior.
Furman	Jackie Carson		Pierre Curtis	Carson left Furman on June 8, 2023, after 13 seasons to become the ACC's senior associate commissioner for women's basketball. Longtime Paladin assistant Curtis was promoted to the position the following day.
Gardner–Webb	Alex Simmons		Scott Merritt	Simmons left Gardner-Webb on April 6, 2023, after five seasons to take the Memphis head coaching job. Wisconsin associate head coach Merritt was hired by the Runnin' Bulldogs on April 22.
Georgetown	James Howard		Tasha Butts	Less than a week after parting ways with Patrick Ewing, Georgetown announced on March 13, 2023, that Howard's contract will not be renewed after six seasons, in which the Hoyas went 66–108 overall capped off by four straight losing seasons. Georgia Tech associate head coach Butts was hired on April 11. Unfortunately, Butts never got to coach a game for Georgetown as she died on October 24, 2023, following a two-year battle with breast cancer.
Grambling State	Freddie Murray		Courtney Simmons	Grambling State parted ways with Murray on March 20, 2023, after seven seasons and a 93–115 record. Troy assistant coach and recruiting coordinator Simmons was hired by the Tigers on April 6.
Idaho	Jon Newlee		Carrie Eighmey	Idaho and Newlee mutually agreed to part ways on April 6, 2023, after 15 seasons. D-II Nebraska–Kearney head coach Eighmey was hired by the Vandals on April 28.
Iona	Billi Chambers		Angelika Szumilo	Chambers departed Iona on April 5, 2023, after ten seasons for the Xavier head coaching job. Fairleigh Dickinson head coach Szumilo was hired by the Gaels on April 17.
Jacksonville	Darnell Haney		Special Jennings	Jacksonville announced a mutual parting of ways with Haney on March 15, 2023, after five seasons. On April 10, the Dolphins hired Jennings from Montverde Academy as his replacement.
Lindenwood	Katie Falco		Amy Eagan	Lindenwood parted ways with Falco on March 17, 2023, after five seasons. The Lions hired Eagan, head coach at D-II Drury the past 3 years, on March 28.
Long Beach State	Jeff Cammon		Amy Wright	Cammon left Long Beach State on March 29, 2023, after five seasons for Saint Mary's. Oklahoma assistant coach and recruiting coordinator Wright was hired by the Beach on April 17.
Louisiana–Monroe	Brooks Donald-Williams		Missy Bilderback	Donald-Williams announced her resignation on March 7, 2023, after four seasons at ULM. The Warhawks went to the NJCAA for their next coach, hiring Jones County JC head coach Missy Bilderback on March 29.
Marist	Brian Giorgis		Erin Doughty	Giorgis announced his retirement on February 28, 2022, effective after the 2022–23 season. During his 22-year tenure at Marist, Giorgis led the Red Foxes to 13 MAAC regular-season and 11 tournament titles, most recently for both in 2021, and also had coached the program to five NCAA tournament victories, the most for any coach in MAAC history. Top assistant Doughty, who had also played under Giorgis at Marist, was designated as his successor.
Marshall	Tony Kemper		Kim Caldwell	Kemper left Marshall on March 10, 2023, after six seasons for the head coaching job at Central Arkansas. Caldwell, head coach at D-II Glenville State for the past seven seasons, was hired by the Thundering Herd on March 27.
Memphis	Katrina Merriweather		Alex Simmons	Merriweather left Memphis on March 25, 2023, after two seasons for the head coaching job at her alma mater Cincinnati. On April 6, the Tigers hired Gardner-Webb head coach Simmons as her replacement.
Miami (OH)	DeUnna Hendrix		Glenn Box	Hendrix resigned from Miami on April 26, 2023, after four seasons, later revealing that an investigation into an inappropriate relationship that Hendrix had with a player led to her resignation. Indiana associate head coach Box was hired by the Redhawks on May 8.
Michigan State	Suzy Merchant		Robyn Fralick	Michigan State announced a mutual agreement on March 13, 2023, for Merchant to step down as head coach after 16 seasons for health reasons. Merchant, who had been diagnosed with a heart abnormality after collapsing during a 2017 game, had not coached since a January 2023 car crash following a medical incident. She led the Spartans to a 327–186 record during her tenure along with 10 trips to the NCAA tournament. Bowling Green head coach Fralick was hired as her replacement on March 31.
Minnesota	Lindsay Whalen		Dawn Plitzuweit	Whalen announced that she was stepping down as head coach of Minnesota on March 2, 2023, after five seasons, but will remain with the school as special assistant to the AD through April 2025. West Virginia head coach Plitzuweit was hired by the Golden Gophers on March 18 after leading the Mountaineers to the NCAA tournament in her lone season there.
New Orleans	Keeshawn Davenport		Trelanne Powell	Davenport announced her resignation from her alma mater on March 16, 2023, after 12 seasons. Trelanne Powell, head coach at D-II Tuskegee University, was hired by the Privateers on April 11.
Nicholls	DoBee Plaisance		Justin Payne	Plaisance announced her resignation from Nicholls, effective April 30, on March 9, 2023, after 15 seasons. D-II Georgia Southwestern head coach and former Nicholls men's basketball player Payne was hired by the Colonels on March 31.
Northeastern	Bridgette Mitchell		Priscilla Edwards	Mitchell left Northeastern on April 7, 2023, after two seasons for the Fordham head coaching job. Clemson assistant coach Edwards was hired by the Huskies on April 20.
North Florida	Darrick Gibbs		Erika Lambert	North Florida fired Gibbs on March 2, 2023, after 8 seasons. Abilene Christian associate head coach and recruiting coordinator Lambert was hired by the Ospreys on April 6.
North Texas	Jalie Mitchell		Jason Burton	Mitchell announced her departure from North Texas on March 20, 2023, after 8 seasons. Texas A&M–Commerce head coach Burton was hired by the Mean Green on March 27.
Pepperdine	Kristen Dowling	Brian Rosario	Tim Hays	Dowling announced her resignation from Pepperdine on February 27, 2023, after four seasons. Waves assistant coach Rosario was named interim head coach of the team for the WCC tournament. After the season ended, the school hired Colorado assistant Hays on April 4. However, Hays would not coach a game for Pepperdine as he announced his resignation on August 14 for family reasons.
Pittsburgh	Lance White		Tory Verdi	Pitt parted ways with White on March 3, 2023, after a 42–99 record in five seasons. The Panthers hired UMass head coach Verdi as his replacement on April 7.
Providence	Jim Crowley		Erin Batth	Crowley and Providence mutually agreed to part ways on March 7, 2023, after seven seasons. On March 20, the Friars named Michigan assistant coach Batth as his replacement.
Sacramento State	Mark Campbell		Aaron Kallhoff	Campbell left Sac State on March 21, 2023, after two seasons for the TCU head coaching job. BYU assistant Kallhoff was hired by the Hornets on April 17.
St. Bonaventure	Jesse Fleming	Erica Morrow	Jim Crowley	St. Bonaventure fired Fleming on January 15, 2023 after 6½ seasons, in which the Bonnies went 53–135 overall, including a 3–17 record to start this season. Assistant coach Morrow, in her first season on the staff, was named interim head coach for the remainder of the season. After the season, the school brought back former head coach Crowley, having served in that role from 2000 to 2016 before leaving for Providence.
St. Francis Brooklyn	Linda Cimino	None		St. Francis College announced on March 20, 2023, that it was eliminating its entire athletic program at the end of the spring season.
Saint Mary's	Paul Thomas	Allyson Fasnacht	Jeff Cammon	Thomas, on paid administrative leave since late December, was fired on January 31, 2023 after 16½ seasons at Saint Mary's. Assistant coach Fasnacht, who was serving as the Gaels' interim head coach during Thomas's initial leave, continued in that role for the rest of the season. After the season ended, Long Beach State head coach Jeff Cammon was hired on March 29.
Seattle	Suzy Barcomb		Skyler Young	Seattle announced on March 20, 2023, that Barcomb will not return next season, ending her 7-year tenure. The Redhawks hired Portland assistant Young on April 19.
South Alabama	Terry Fowler		Yolisha Jackson	Fowler was relieved of his head coaching duties on March 1, 2023, after ten seasons at South Alabama. South Florida assistant coach Jackson was hired by the Jaguars on March 24.
Stephen F. Austin	Mark Kellogg		Leonard Bishop	Kellogg left Stephen F. Austin on April 3, 2023, after 8 seasons for the West Virginia head coaching job. Ladyjacks associate head coach Bishop was promoted to the position on April 14.
Tarleton	Misty Wilson		Bill Brock	Tarleton parted ways with Wilson on March 2, 2023, after nine seasons. The Texans initially hired former longtime Baylor assistant Brock, who spent last season as head coach at NJCAA McLennan CC, on March 14, but did not make it official until March 27.
TCU	Raegan Pebley		Mark Campbell	Pebley announced on February 27, 2023, that she would step down from her position after the season, her 9th at TCU. Sacramento State head coach Campbell was hired by the Horned Frogs on March 21.
Texas A&M–Commerce	Jason Burton		Valerie King	Burton departed Texas A&M–Commerce after nine seasons on March 27, 2023, for the North Texas head coaching job. New Mexico associate head coach King was named the new head coach of the Lions on April 19.
UMass	Tory Verdi		Mike Leflar	Verdi left UMass on April 7, 2023, after six seasons for the Pitt head coaching position. The Minutewomen promoted associate head coach Leflar to the position 3 days later.
UTEP	Kevin Baker		Keitha Adams	Baker announced his resignation on April 5, 2023, after six seasons at UTEP. Keitha Adams, head coach of the Miners from 2001 to 2017 before leaving for Wichita State, was re-hired on April 11.
Weber State	Velaida Harris		Jenteal Jackson	Harris stepped down from her position on March 10, 2023, after five seasons at Weber State. D2 Westminster College (UT) head coach Jackson was hired by the Wildcats on April 12.
West Virginia	Dawn Plitzuweit		Mark Kellogg	Plitzuweit departed West Virginia on March 18, 2023, for Minnesota after reaching the NCAA tournament in her lone season as head coach of the Mountaineers. Stephen F. Austin head coach Kellogg was hired on April 3.
Wichita State	Keitha Adams		Terry Nooner	Adams left Wichita State on April 11, 2023, after six seasons to return to UTEP. The Shockers stayed in state for their next hire, naming Kansas associate head coach Nooner as her replacement on April 17.
Xavier	Melanie Moore		Billi Chambers	Moore and Xavier mutually agreed to part ways on March 6, 2023, after four seasons and a 24–81 record. Iona head coach Chambers was hired by the Musketeers on April 5.

== See also ==
- 2022–23 NCAA Division I men's basketball season
