= Jeff Cammon =

American basketball coach

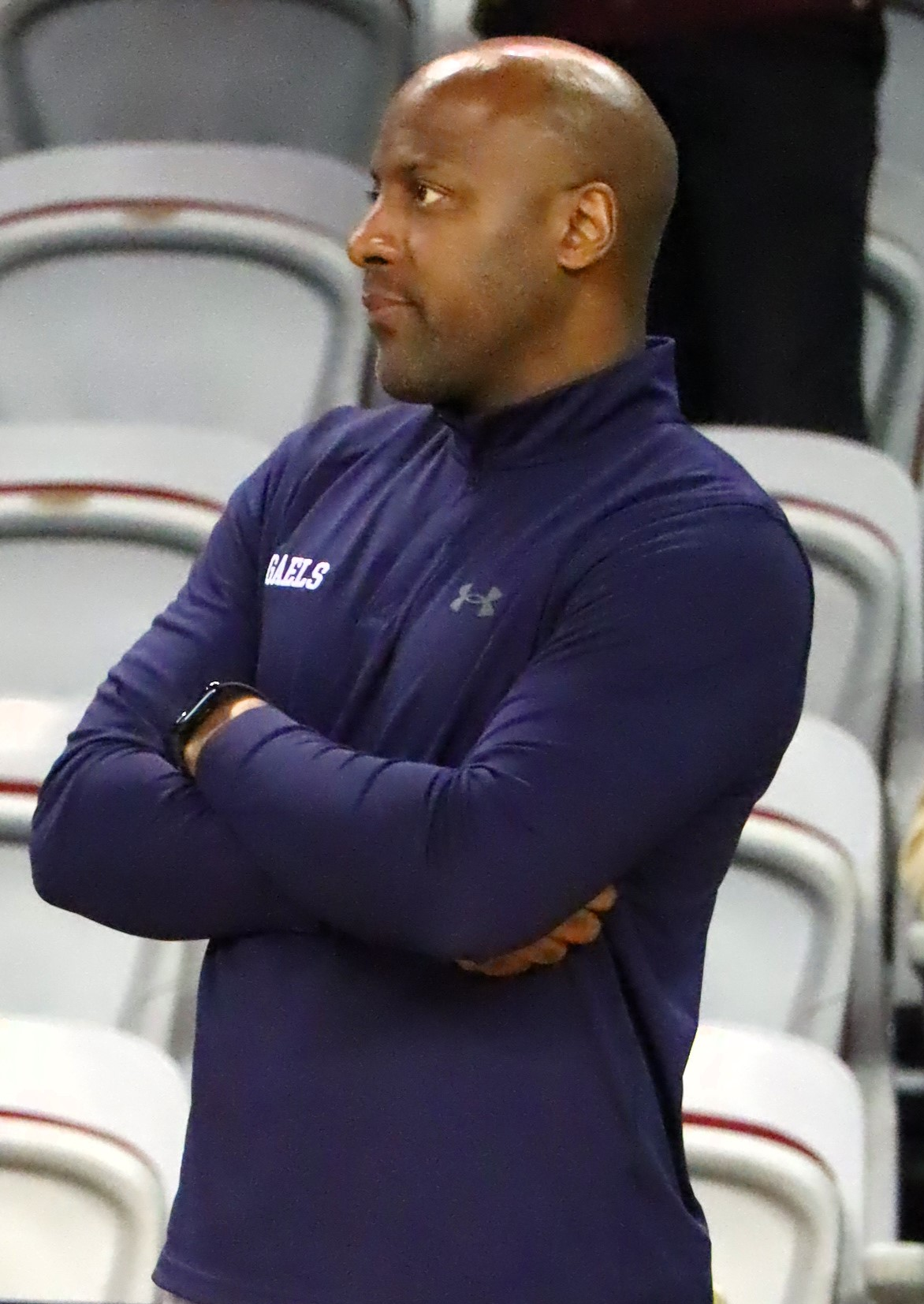
- Cammon in 2025

Current position
- Title: Head coach
- Team: Saint Mary's
- Conference: WCC
- Record: 42–52 (.447)

Biographical details
- Born: December 25, 1979 (age 46); Pomona, California, U.S.

Playing career
- 1998–2003: Alcorn State

Coaching career (HC unless noted)

Men's basketball
- 2003–2004: Diamond Ranch HS (assistant)
- 2004–2005: Alcorn State (GA)
- 2005–2006: Chaffey CC (assistant)
- 2006–2007: Kentucky Wesleyan (assistant)

Women's basketball
- 2007–2009: Bishop Alemany HS
- 2009–2014: Long Beach State (assistant)
- 2014–2016: California (assistant)
- 2016–2017: Colorado (assistant)
- 2017–2023: Long Beach State
- 2023–present: Saint Mary's

Head coaching record
- Overall: 126–142 (.470) (college); 29–24 (.547) (high school)

Jeffrey Jerell Cammon (born December 25, 1979) is an American basketball coach who is currently the head women's basketball coach at Saint Mary's College of California, a role he has held since 2023.

== Coaching career ==
Cammon began his coaching career at Diamond Ranch High School in California as an assistant before spending time as an assistant at Alcorn State, Chaffey Community College, and Kentucky Wesleyan. He returned to California to coach the women's varsity team at Bishop Alemany High School, where he was also a history teacher.

After two seasons at Bishop Alemany, Cammon joined the coaching staff of first-year head coach Jody Wynn at Long Beach State. He spent five seasons with the program before moving on spend a season each with California and Colorado.

=== Long Beach State (second stint) ===
Cammon was named the head coach at Long Beach State on May 11, 2017, replacing Wynn.

== Head coaching record ==
=== College ===
Statistics overview
Season	Team	Overall	Conference	Standing	Postseason
Long Beach State Beach (Big West Conference) (2017–2023)
2017–18	Long Beach State	8–23	6–10	T–6th	
2018–19	Long Beach State	9–22	5–11	7th	
2019–20	Long Beach State	13–17	8–8	5th	
2020–21	Long Beach State	12–9	11–7	3rd	
2021–22	Long Beach State	19–9	12–6	3rd	
2022–23	Long Beach State	23–10	17–3	2nd	WNIT First Round
Long Beach State:		84–89 (.486)	59–45 (.567)		
Saint Mary's Gaels (West Coast Conference) (2023–present)
2023–24	Saint Mary's	13–18	6–10	6th	
2024–25	Saint Mary's	14–17	10–10	6th	WNIT First Round
2025–26	Saint Mary's	15–17	6–12	T–8th	
Saint Mary's:		42–52 (.447)	22–32 (.407)		
Total:		126–142 (.470)			
National champion Postseason invitational champion Conference regular season champion Conference regular season and conference tournament champion Division regular season champion Division regular season and conference tournament champion Conference tournament champion

=== High school ===
Statistics overview
Season	Team	Overall	Conference	Standing	Postseason
Bishop Alemany Warriors (Mission League) (2007–2009)
2007–08	Bishop Alemany	10–14	5–5	4th	
2008–09	Bishop Alemany	19–10	7–3	3rd	
Bishop Alemany:		29–24 (.547)	12–8 (.600)		
Total:		29–24 (.547)			
National champion Postseason invitational champion Conference regular season champion Conference regular season and conference tournament champion Division regular season champion Division regular season and conference tournament champion Conference tournament champion
