= 2022–23 Louisiana Tech Lady Techsters basketball team =

American college basketball season

2022–23 Louisiana Tech Lady Techsters basketball

WNIT, First Round
- Conference: Conference USA
- Record: 19–13 (12–8 C-USA)
- Head coach: Brooke Stoehr (7th season)
- Assistant coaches: Nitra Perry; Scott Stoehr; Pierre Miller
- Home arena: Thomas Assembly Center

2022–23 Conference USA women's basketball standings
	Conf.				Overall
Team	W		L	PCT	W		L	PCT
Middle Tennessee†	18	–	2	.900	28	–	5	.848
Western Kentucky	14	–	6	.700	19	–	14	.576
Rice	13	–	7	.650	23	–	9	.719
UTEP	12	–	8	.600	20	–	12	.625
Louisiana Tech	12	–	8	.600	19	–	13	.594
UTSA	9	–	11	.450	13	–	19	.406
North Texas	8	–	12	.400	11	–	20	.355
FIU	7	–	13	.350	14	–	19	.424
Charlotte	7	–	13	.350	12	–	19	.387
UAB	5	–	15	.250	14	–	17	.452
Florida Atlantic	5	–	15	.250	12	–	18	.400
† 2023 C-USA tournament winner As of March 19, 2023

The 2022–23 Louisiana Tech Lady Techsters basketball team represented Louisiana Tech University during the 2022–23 NCAA Division I women's basketball season. The team was led by seventh-year head coach Brooke Stoehr, and played their home games at the Thomas Assembly Center in Ruston, Louisiana as a member of Conference USA.

== Previous season ==
The Lady Techsters finished the 2021–22 season 21–12, 11–7 in C-USA play and won the C-USA West Division Regular Season Title. They defeated UAB and Middle Tennessee to advance to the championship game of the C-USA tournament where they lost to Charlotte. They were invited to the WNIT, where they lost at home to Houston.

== Roster ==
2022–23 Louisiana Tech Lady Techsters women's basketball team
Players
Coaches

Pos.	#	Name	Height	Year	Previous school	Hometown
G	1	Autumn Smith	5 ft 6 in (1.68 m)	So	Martin High School	Arlington, Texas
G	2	Keiunna Walker	5 ft 6 in (1.68 m)	Sr	Lonoke High School	Lonoke, Arkansas
G	3	Robyn Lee	5 ft 9 in (1.75 m)	So	Moss Point High School	Moss Point, Mississippi
G	4	Lotte Sant	6 ft 1 in (1.85 m)	Jr	Calandlyceum High School	Amsterdam, the Netherlands
G	10	Salma Bates	5 ft 7 in (1.7 m)	Jr	John Curtis High School; Tulane	Kenner, Louisiana
G	12	Gabbie Green	5 ft 7 in (1.7 m)		Bellville High School; Pittsburgh	Bellville, Texas
F	23	Silvia Nativi	6 ft 0 in (1.83 m)	So	Benedetto Varchi	Ferrara, Italy
G	24	Amaya Brannon	5 ft 11 in (1.8 m)	So	Plano Senior High School	Plano, Texas
F	32	Kate Thompson	6 ft 2 in (1.88 m)		Denham Springs High School; Wisconsin	Denham Springs, Louisiana
F	33	Mackenzie Wurm	6 ft 4 in (1.93 m)	So	Allen High School	Allen, Texas
F	34	Ayen Angoi	6 ft 0 in (1.83 m)	RS Fr	Bishop Lynch High School	Dallas, Texas
F	44	Anna Larr Roberson	6 ft 3 in (1.91 m)	Jr	Cedar Creek School	Ruston, Louisiana
G	45	Anja Bukvic	5 ft 10 in (1.78 m)	Fr	V Economic School	Belgrade, Serbia

Head coach

- Brooke Stoehr

Assistant coach(es)

- Nitra Perry
- Scott Stoehr
- Pierre Miller

Legend

- (C) Team captain
- (S) Suspended
- (I) Ineligible
- (W) Walk-on
- Injured
- Current redshirt

Roster
Last update: 12/13/2022

== Schedule and results ==
Date time, TV	Rank^{#}	Opponent^{#}	Result	Record	Site (attendance) city, state
Non-conference regular season
November 7, 2022*; 5:30 p.m., CUSA.tv		Central Baptist College	W 86–30	1–0	Thomas Assembly Center (1,459); Ruston, LA
November 10, 2022*; 11:30 a.m., CUSA.tv		Arkansas State	W 59-56	2-0	Thomas Assembly Center (2,948); Ruston, LA
November 13, 2022*; 2:00 p.m., ESPN+		at Louisiana–Monroe	W 68–53	3–0	Fant–Ewing Coliseum (1,213); Monroe, LA
November 22, 2022*; 4:00 p.m., ESPN+		at SMU	L 59-63	3-1	Moody Coliseum (622); Dallas, TX
November 25, 2022*; 6:00 p.m.		vs. Stetson; UNLV Tournament	W 73-50	4-1	Thomas & Mack Center; Las Vegas, NV
November 26, 2022*; 4:30 p.m		vs. Illinois State; UNLV Tournament	L 53-70	4-2	Thomas & Mack Center (925); Las Vegas, NV
November 27, 2022*; 3:30 p.m.		vs. George Washington; UNLV Tournament	W 71-52	5-2	Cox Pavilion; Las Vegas, NV
December 3, 2022*; 2:00 p.m., CUSA.tv		Alcorn State	W 70-59	6-2	Thomas Assembly Center (1,338); Ruston, LA
December 8, 2022*; 6:00 p.m., ESPN+		Vanderbilt	L 70-75 ^{OT}	6-3	Thomas Assembly Center (1,515); Ruston, LA
December 12, 2022*; 6:00 p.m., CUSA.tv		South Alabama	W 73-50	7-3	Thomas Assembly Center (1,190); Ruston, LA
CUSA regular season
December 18, 2022; 2:00 p.m., CUSA.tv		UTEP	L 54-62	7-4 (0-1)	Thomas Assembly Center (1,371); Ruston, LA
December 29, 2022; 7:00 p.m., CUSA.tv		at UTSA	W 62-57	8-4 (1-1)	Convocation Center (852); San Antonio, TX
December 31, 2022; 2:00 p.m., CUSA.tv		Charlotte	L 57-66	8-5 (1-2)	Thomas Assembly Center (1,622); Ruston, LA
January 5, 2023; 6:00 p.m., CUSA.tv		Rice	W 79-74	9-5 (2-2)	Thomas Assembly Center (1,273); Ruston, LA
January 7, 2023; 2:00 p.m., CUSA.tv		at UTEP	L 66-72	9-6 (2-3)	Don Haskins Center (856); El Paso, TX
January 11, 2023; 6:00 p.m., CUSA.tv		North Texas	W 81-66	10-6 (3-3)	Thomas Assembly Center (1,265); Ruston, LA
January 14, 2023; 2:00 p.m., CUSA.tv		at UAB	W 61-55	11-6 (4-3)	Bartow Arena (289); Birmingham, AL
January 19, 2023; 6:30 p.m., ESPN+		at Western Kentucky	L 55-66	11-7 (4-4)	E. A. Diddle Arena (822); Bowling Green, KY
January 21, 2023; 1:00 p.m., ESPN+		at Middle Tennessee	L 50-68	11-8 (4-5)	Murphy Center (3,411); Murfreesboro, TN
January 26, 2023; 2:00 p.m., CUSA.tv		UAB	W 67-62	12-8 (5-5)	Thomas Assembly Center (1,165); Ruston, LA
January 28, 2023; 1:00 p.m., CUSA.tv		UTSA	L 63-66	12-9 (5-6)	Thomas Assembly Center (1,438); Ruston, LA
February 2, 2023; 7:00 p.m., CUSA.tv		at Rice	L 57-60	12-10 (5-7)	Tudor Fieldhouse (575); Houston, TX
February 9, 2023; 6:00 p.m., CUSA.tv		FIU	W 76-65	13-10 (6-7)	Thomas Assembly Center (1,394); Ruston, LA
February 11, 2023; 2:00 p.m., CUSA.tv		Florida Atlantic	W 68-56	14-10 (7-7)	Thomas Assembly Center (1,795); Ruston, LA
February 16, 2023; 6:30 p.m., ESPN+		at North Texas	W 57-44	15-10 (8-7)	UNT Coliseum (1,547); Denton, TX
February 18, 2023; 1:00 p.m., ESPN+		at Charlotte	W 83-79 ^{2OT}	16-10 (9-7)	Dale F. Halton Arena (749); Charlotte, NC
February 23, 2023; 6:00 p.m., CUSA.tv		Western Kentucky	W 70-65	17-10 (10-7)	Thomas Assembly Center (1,323); Ruston, LA
February 25, 2023; 1:00 p.m., ESPN3		No. 25 Middle Tennessee	L 59-61	17-11 (10-8)	Thomas Assembly Center (1,637); Ruston, LA
March 2, 2023; 6:00 p.m., ESPN+		at FIU	W 69-62	18-11 (11-8)	Ocean Bank Convocation Center (668); Miami, FL
March 4, 2023; 1:00 p.m., CUSA.tv		at Florida Atlantic	W 65-60	19-11 (12-8)	Eleanor R. Baldwin Arena; Boca Raton, FL
CUSA Tournament
March 9, 2023; 11:30 a.m., ESPN+	(5)	vs. (4) UTEP; Quarterfinals	L 54-64	19-12	Ford Center at The Star (1,708); Frisco, TX
WNIT
March 16, 2023*; 8:00 p.m., SEC Network+		at Arkansas; First Round	L 47-69	19-13	Bud Walton Arena (1,460); Fayetteville, Arkansas
*Non-conference game. ^{#}Rankings from AP Poll. (#) Tournament seedings in parentheses. All times are in Central.

== See also ==
- 2022–23 Louisiana Tech Bulldogs basketball team
- Louisiana Tech Lady Techsters basketball
