= Rick Insell =

American basketball coach (born 1951)

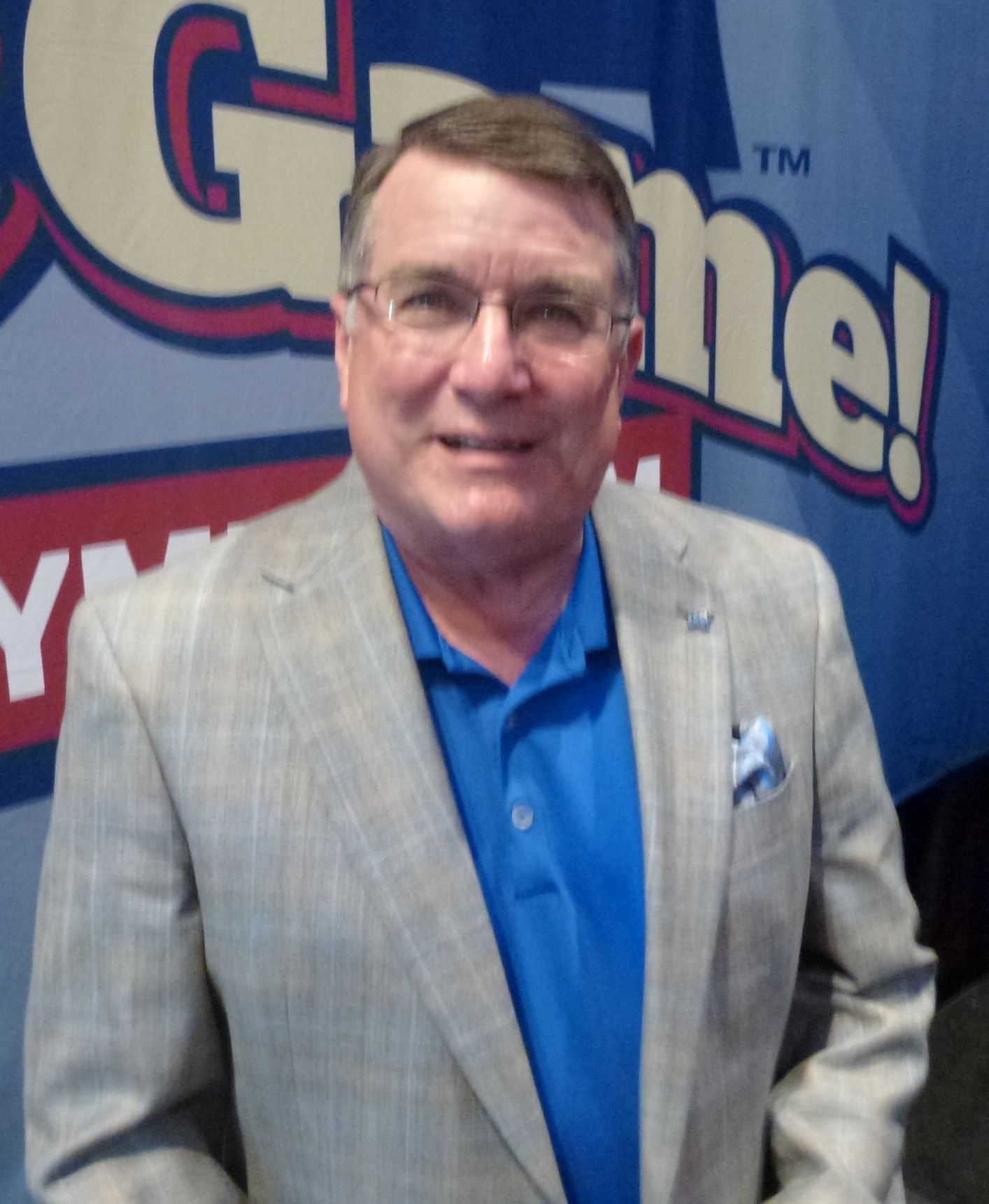
- Insell in 2014

Biographical details
- Born: June 5, 1951 (age 75); Woodbury, Tennessee, U.S.
- Education: Middle Tennessee State ('77)

Coaching career (HC unless noted)
- 1977–2005: Shelbyville Central HS
- 2005–2026: Middle Tennessee

Head coaching record
- Overall: 506–181 (.737) (NCAA); 775–148 (.840) (high school)
- Tournaments: NCAA (2–11); WNIT (13–9); WBIT (0–1)
- Women's Basketball Hall of Fame

Rick Insell (born June 5, 1951) is the former head coach for the Middle Tennessee State University women's basketball team. Insell announced his retirement from coaching on March 19, 2026 after the conclusion of the 2025-2026 season.

== Career ==
He was the head coach of the Shelbyville Central High School girls' basketball team for 28 seasons. Coach Insell compiled a record of 775–148 (.840) and won 10 state championships and won a Tennessee record 110 straight games. Insell was inducted into the Women's Basketball Hall of Fame in 2017.

Coach Insell achieved his 500th win at MTSU on January 23, 2026, making him the 24th college basketball coach to achieve 500 wins. The victory also made Insell the first coach to win 500 games at both the high school and collegiate level.

== Head coaching record ==
Record table
| Season | Team | Overall | Conference | Standing | Postseason |
|---|---|---|---|---|---|
Middle Tennessee Blue Raiders (Sun Belt Conference) (2005–2013)
| 2005–06 | Middle Tennessee | 20–11 | 10–4 | 2nd (East) | NCAA 1st Round |
| 2006–07 | Middle Tennessee | 30–4 | 18–0 | 1st (East) | NCAA 2nd Round |
| 2007–08 | Middle Tennessee | 22–12 | 14–4 | T-2nd (East) | WNIT Second Round |
| 2008–09 | Middle Tennessee | 28–6 | 17–1 | 1st (East) | NCAA 1st Round |
| 2009–10 | Middle Tennessee | 25–6 | 17–1 | 1st (East) | NCAA 1st Round |
| 2010–11 | Middle Tennessee | 23–8 | 14–2 | 1st (East) | NCAA 1st Round |
| 2011–12 | Middle Tennessee | 26–7 | 16–0 | 1st (East) | NCAA 1st Round |
| 2012–13 | Middle Tennessee | 25–8 | 17–3 | 1st (East) | NCAA 1st Round |
| Middle Tennessee (Sun Belt): | | 199–62 (.762) | 123–15 (.891) | | |
Middle Tennessee Blue Raiders (Conference USA) (2013–2026)
| 2013–14 | Middle Tennessee | 29–5 | 15–1 | 1st | NCAA 1st Round |
| 2014–15 | Middle Tennessee | 24–10 | 14–4 | 2nd | WNIT Quarterfinals |
| 2015–16 | Middle Tennessee | 24–9 | 15–3 | T-2nd | NCAA 1st Round |
| 2016–17 | Middle Tennessee | 23–11 | 15–3 | 2nd | WNIT Third Round |
| 2017–18 | Middle Tennessee | 18–13 | 10–6 | T-3rd | WNIT First Round |
| 2018–19 | Middle Tennessee | 23–11 | 11–5 | T-3rd | WNIT Second Round |
| 2019–20 | Middle Tennessee | 21–9 | 13–5 | 4th | |
| 2020–21 | Middle Tennessee | 17–8 | 12–4 | 1st (East) | NCAA 1st Round |
| 2021–22 | Middle Tennessee | 27–8 | 14–4 | 2nd (East) | WNIT Semifinals |
| 2022–23 | Middle Tennessee | 28–5 | 18–2 | 1st | NCAA 1st Round |
| 2023–24 | Middle Tennessee | 30–5 | 16–0 | 1st | NCAA 2nd Round |
| 2024–25 | Middle Tennessee | 26–9 | 16–2 | T–1st | WBIT 1st Round |
| 2025–26 | Middle Tennessee | 17–16 | 11–7 | T–3rd | WNIT Super 16 |
| Middle Tennessee (C-USA): | | 307–119 (.721) | 180–46 (.796) | | |
| Total: | | 506–181 (.737) | | | |
National champion Postseason invitational champion Conference regular season champion Conference regular season and conference tournament champion Division regular season champion Division regular season and conference tournament champion Conference tournament champion
