= 2022–23 UTSA Roadrunners women's basketball team =

American college basketball season

2022–23 UTSA Roadrunners women's basketball
- Conference: Conference USA
- West Division
- Record: 13–19 (9–11 CUSA)
- Head coach: Karen Aston (2nd season)
- Associate head coach: Jamie Carey
- Assistant coaches: Empress Davenport; Cameron Miles
- Home arena: Convocation Center

2022–23 Conference USA women's basketball standings
	Conf.				Overall
Team	W		L	PCT	W		L	PCT
Middle Tennessee†	18	–	2	.900	28	–	5	.848
Western Kentucky	14	–	6	.700	19	–	14	.576
Rice	13	–	7	.650	23	–	9	.719
UTEP	12	–	8	.600	20	–	12	.625
Louisiana Tech	12	–	8	.600	19	–	13	.594
UTSA	9	–	11	.450	13	–	19	.406
North Texas	8	–	12	.400	11	–	20	.355
FIU	7	–	13	.350	14	–	19	.424
Charlotte	7	–	13	.350	12	–	19	.387
UAB	5	–	15	.250	14	–	17	.452
Florida Atlantic	5	–	15	.250	12	–	18	.400
† 2023 C-USA tournament winner As of March 19, 2023

The 2022–23 UTSA Roadrunners women's basketball team represented the University of Texas at San Antonio during the 2022–23 NCAA Division I women's basketball season. The team was led by second-year head coach Karen Aston, and played their home games at the Convocation Center in San Antonio, Texas as their final season as a member of Conference USA.

== Schedule and results ==
Date time, TV	Rank^{#}	Opponent^{#}	Result	Record	Site (attendance) city, state
Non-conference regular season
November 7, 2022*; 6:30 p.m.		at Stephen F. Austin	L 63–68	0–1	William R. Johnson Coliseum (1,709); Nacogdoches, TX
November 16, 2022*; 7:30 p.m., ESPN+		at TCU	L 67–74	0–2	Schollmaier Arena (1480); Fort Worth, TX
November 20, 2022*; 3:00 p.m., ESPN+		Abilene Christian	W 76–70	1–2	Convocation Center (784); San Antonio, TX
November 25, 2022*; 4:15 p.m., FloSports		vs. Missouri State; Las Vegas Invitational	L 51–74	1–3	The Mirage; Paradise, NV
November 26, 2022*; 4:15 p.m., FloSports		vs. St. John's; Las Vegas Invitational	L 64–69	1–4	The Mirage; Paradise, NV
November 30, 2022*; 8:00 p.m.		Texas State; I-35 Rivalry	L 55–60	1–5	Strahan Arena (946); San Marcos, TX
December 10, 2022*; 12:00 p.m.		Idaho	W 76–69	2–5	Convocation Center (1,041); San Antonio, TX
December 15, 2022*; 7:00 p.m.		at Incarnate Word	L 53–56	2–6	McDermott Center (328); San Antonio, TX
December 19, 2022*; 12:00 p.m.		at Houston	L 89–93 ^{OT}	2–7	Fertitta Center (872); Houston, TX
CUSA regular season
December 29, 2022; 8:00 p.m.		Louisiana Tech	L 57–62	2–8 (0–1)	Convocation Center (852); San Antonio, TX
December 31, 2022; 8:00 p.m.		UAB	W 71–68	3–8 (1–1)	Convocation Center (1,070); San Antonio, TX
January 5, 2023; 6:00 p.m., ESPN+		at Middle Tennessee	L 41–80	3–9 (1–2)	Murphy Center (2,582); Murfreesboro, TN
January 7, 2023; 2:00 a.m.		at Western Kentucky	L 69–77	3–10 (1–3)	E. A. Diddle Arena (717); Bowling Green, KY
January 11, 2023; 8:00 p.m.		UTEP	L 67–74	3–11 (1–4)	Convocation Center (507); San Antonio, TX
January 14, 2023; 3:00 p.m., ESPN+		Charlotte	W 64–50	4–11 (2–4)	Convocation Center (1,340); San Antonio, TX
January 16, 2023; 8:00 p.m.		at Rice	L 76–79	4–12 (2–5)	Tudor Fieldhouse (631); Houston, TX
January 19, 2023; 7:00 p.m.		at Florida Atlantic	L 66–81	4–13 (2–6)	FAU Arena; Boca Raton, FL
January 21, 2023; 1:00 p.m.		at FIU	L 48–51	4–14 (2–7)	Ocean Bank Convocation Center (410); Miami, FL
January 26, 2023; 8:00 p.m.		North Texas	L 51–53	4–15 (2–8)	Convocation Center (781); San Antonio, TX
January 28, 2023; 1:00 p.m.		at Louisiana Tech	W 66–63	5–15 (3–8)	Thomas Assembly Center (1,438); Ruston, LA
February 2, 2023; 8:00 p.m.		Western Kentucky	L 67–73	5–16 (3–9)	Convocation Center (687); San Antonio, TX
February 4, 2023; 3:00 p.m., ESPN+		No. 21 Middle Tennessee	W 58–53	6–16 (4–9)	Convocation Center (560); San Antonio, TX
February 11, 2023; 8:00 p.m.		at UTEP	L 52–79	6–17 (4–10)	Don Haskins Center (1,095); El Paso, TX
February 16, 2023; 8:00 p.m.		Rice	W 66–53	7–17 (5–10)	Convocation Center (880); San Antonio, TX
February 18, 2023; 2:00 p.m.		at UAB	L 64–67	7–18 (6-11)	Bartow Arena (418); Birmingham, AL
February 20, 2023; 7:30 p.m.		at North Texas	W 68–67 ^{OT}	8–18 (7–11)	UNT Coliseum (1,413); Denton, TX
February 23, 2023; 8:00 p.m.		Florida Atlantic	W 77–61	9–18 (8–11)	Convocation Center (909); San Antonio, TX
February 25, 2023; 1:00 p.m.		Florida International	W 77–61	10–18 (9–11)	Convocation Center (752); San Antonio, TX
March 2, 2023; 6:00 p.m.		at Charlotte	W 64–50	11–18 (10–11)	Dale F. Halton Arena (603); Charlotte, NC
CUSA Tournament
March 8, 2023; 3:00 p.m., ESPN+	(6)	vs. (11) Florida Atlantic; First Round	W 69–68	12–18 (9–11)	Ford Center at The Star (789); Frisco, TX
March 9, 2023; 1:00 p.m., ESPN+	(6)	vs. (3) Rice; Quarterfinals	W 62–54	13–18 (9–11)	Ford Center at The Star (2,225); Frisco, TX
March 10, 2023; 7:00 p.m., ESPN+	(6)	vs. (2) Western Kentucky; Semifinals	L 66–70	13–19 (9–11)	Ford Center at The Star (2,407); Frisco, TX
*Non-conference game. ^{#}Rankings from AP Poll. (#) Tournament seedings in parentheses. All times are in Central.
