= 2024–25 Utah Utes women's basketball team =

Women's college basketball season

2024–25 Utah Utes women's basketball

NCAA tournament, First Round
- Conference: Big 12 Conference
- Record: 22–9 (13–5 Big 12)
- Head coach: Lynne Roberts (10th season; first 4 games); Gavin Petersen (since 11/19/24)
- Assistant coaches: Jordan Sullivan; Morgan Bailey
- Home arena: Jon M. Huntsman Center

2024–25 Big 12 Conference women's basketball standings
| | Conf. | | | | Overall |
| Team | W | | L | PCT | W | | L | PCT |
|---|---|---|---|---|---|---|---|---|
| No. 6 TCU † | 16 | – | 2 | .889 | 34 | – | 4 | .895 |
| No. 14 Baylor | 15 | – | 3 | .833 | 28 | – | 8 | .778 |
| No. 17 Oklahoma State | 14 | – | 4 | .778 | 25 | – | 7 | .781 |
| No. 16 West Virginia | 13 | – | 5 | .722 | 25 | – | 8 | .758 |
| No. 19 Kansas State | 13 | – | 5 | .722 | 28 | – | 8 | .778 |
| Utah | 13 | – | 5 | .722 | 22 | – | 9 | .710 |
| Iowa State | 12 | – | 6 | .667 | 23 | – | 12 | .657 |
| Arizona | 10 | – | 8 | .556 | 19 | – | 14 | .576 |
| Colorado | 9 | – | 9 | .500 | 21 | – | 13 | .618 |
| Cincinnati | 7 | – | 11 | .389 | 15 | – | 14 | .517 |
| Kansas | 6 | – | 12 | .333 | 16 | – | 14 | .533 |
| BYU | 4 | – | 14 | .222 | 13 | – | 17 | .433 |
| UCF | 4 | – | 14 | .222 | 12 | – | 18 | .400 |
| Texas Tech | 4 | – | 14 | .222 | 19 | – | 18 | .514 |
| Arizona State | 3 | – | 15 | .167 | 10 | – | 22 | .313 |
| Houston | 1 | – | 17 | .056 | 5 | – | 25 | .167 |
† 2025 Big 12 tournament winner Rankings from AP poll

The 2024–25 Utah Utes women's basketball team represented the University of Utah during the 2024–25 NCAA Division I women's basketball season. The Utes were led by tenth-year head coach Lynne Roberts through the first four games of the season, before she left to take a Los Angeles Sparks head coaching job. Associate head coach Gavin Petersen was named her replacement. The Utes played their home games at the Jon M. Huntsman Center, and competed as first-year members of the Big 12 Conference.

== Previous season ==
The Utes finished the 2023–24 season 23–11, 11–7 in Pac-12 play to finish in a tie for fifth place. As the No. 6 seed in the Pac-12 tournament, they defeated Arizona State in the first round before losing in the quarterfinals to UCLA. They received an at-large bid to the NCAA women's tournament as a No. 5 seed in the Portland Region 4, where they defeated South Dakota State in the first round before losing in the second round to Gonzaga to end their season.

This was the last season that Utah played in the Pac-12 Conference before moving to the Big 12 Conference.

On November 19, it was announced that Lynne Roberts had accepted the position of head coach of the Los Angeles Sparks. Petersen was named head coach three days later, on November 22, 2024.

== Offseason ==
=== Departures ===
Utah departures
| Name | Num | Pos. | Height | Year | Hometown | Reason for departure |
|---|---|---|---|---|---|---|
| Isabel Palmer | 1 | G | 5'9" | Senior | Newcastle, Australia | Graduated |
| Lani White | 3 | G | 5'11" | Sophomore | Irvine, CA | Transferred to Virginia Tech |
| Daniela Falcon Hernandez | 11 | F | 6'2" | Freshman | Las Palmas Gran Canaria, Spain | Transferred to UC Irvine |
| Dasia Young | 34 | F | 5'11" | Senior | Jonesboro, AR | Graduated |
| Alissa Pili | 35 | F | 6'2" | Senior | Anchorage, AK | Graduated/2024 WNBA draft; selected 8th overall by Minnesota Lynx |

=== Incoming ===
Utah incoming transfers
| Name | Num | Pos. | Height | Year | Hometown | Previous school |
|---|---|---|---|---|---|---|
| Chyra Evans | 12 | F | 6'2" | Junior | Newcastle, Australia | Michigan |
| Mayé Touré | 21 | F | 6'2" | Graduate student | Athis-Mons, France | Rhode Island |

=== Recruiting class of 2024 ===
College recruiting
| Name | Hometown | School | Height | Weight | Commit date |
|---|---|---|---|---|---|
| Brooke Walker; PG | Andover, KS | Andover High School | 5 ft 8 in (1.73 m) | N/A | |
| Brooke Walker; PG | Recruit ratings: ESPN: (93) | | | | |
| Kylie Ray; G | La Crescenta, CA | Crescenta Valley High School | 5 ft 8 in (1.73 m) | N/A | |
| Kylie Ray; G | Recruit ratings: ESPN: (91) | | | | |
Overall recruit ranking:
Note: In many cases, Scout, Rivals, 247Sports, On3, and ESPN may conflict in their listings of height and weight.; In these cases, the average was taken. ESPN grades are on a 100-point scale.; Sources: "2024 Player Commits". ESPN. Archived from the original on November 22, 2024.

=== Recruiting class of 2025 ===
College recruiting (2024)
| Name | Hometown | School | Height | Weight | Commit date |
|---|---|---|---|---|---|
| Leonna Sneed; PG | San Antonio, TX | Karen Wagner High School | 5 ft 6 in (1.68 m) | N/A | |
| Leonna Sneed; PG | Recruit ratings: ESPN: (96) | | | | |
| Avery Hjelmstad; G | Edmond, OK | Edmond Memorial High School | 6 ft 0 in (1.83 m) | N/A | |
| Avery Hjelmstad; G | Recruit ratings: ESPN: (94) | | | | |
Overall recruit ranking:
Note: In many cases, Scout, Rivals, 247Sports, On3, and ESPN may conflict in their listings of height and weight.; In these cases, the average was taken. ESPN grades are on a 100-point scale.; Sources: "2025 Player Commits". ESPN. Archived from the original on November 22, 2024.

== Roster ==
2024–25 Utah Utes women's basketball team
Players
Coaches

| Pos. | # | Name | Height | Year | Previous school | Hometown |
|---|---|---|---|---|---|---|
| G | 2 | Inês Vieira | 5 ft 6 in (1.68 m) | Sr | Quinta Lombos | Madeira Island, Portugal |
| G | 3 | Brooke Walker | 5 ft 9 in (1.75 m) | Fr | Andover HS | Andover, KS |
| G | 5 | Gianna Kneepkens | 6 ft 0 in (1.83 m) | RS Jr | Duluth Marshall HS | Duluth, MN |
| G | 6 | Kylie Ray | 5 ft 8 in (1.73 m) | Fr | Crescenta Valley HS | La Crescenta, CA |
| G | 10 | Grace Foster | 5 ft 10 in (1.78 m) | Fr | Willetton | Perth, Australia |
| F | 12 | Chyra Evans | 6 ft 3 in (1.91 m) | Jr | Lake Ginninderra; Michigan | Newcastle, Australia |
| F | 15 | Alyssa Blanck | 6 ft 2 in (1.88 m) | RS So | Olympus HS; BYU | Holladay, UT |
| F | 20 | Reese Ross | 6 ft 1 in (1.85 m) | So | St. Thomas More HS | Rapid City, SD |
| F | 21 | Mayé Touré | 6 ft 3 in (1.91 m) | GS | Lycée Alain Fournier; Rhode Island | Athis-Mons, France |
| F | 22 | Jenna Johnson | 6 ft 2 in (1.88 m) | Sr | Wayzata HS | Medina, MN |
| G | 23 | Maty Wilke | 5 ft 10 in (1.78 m) | RS Jr | Beaver Dam HS; Wisconsin | Beaver Dam, WI |
| G | 24 | Kennady McQueen | 5 ft 10 in (1.78 m) | Sr | North Summit High School | Henefer, UT |
| C | 25 | Néné Sow | 6 ft 8 in (2.03 m) | Sr | Northeastern Oklahoma A&M | Brussels, Belgium |
| F | 44 | Samantha Crispe | 6 ft 2 in (1.88 m) | Jr | Arapahoe HS; Boston University | Castle Pines, CO |

Head coach

- Gavin Petersen (Hawaiʻi)

Assistant coach(es)

- Jordan Sullivan (Montana)
- Morgan Bailey (BYU)

Legend

- (C) Team captain
- (S) Suspended
- (I) Ineligible
- (W) Walk-on
- Injured
- Current redshirt

Roster

== Schedule and results ==
| Date time, TV | Rank^{#} | Opponent^{#} | Result | Record | High points | High rebounds | High assists | Site (attendance) city, state |
Non-conference regular season
| November 4, 2024*; 11:00 a.m., ESPN+ | | Southern Utah | W 105–52 | 1–0 | 18 – Kneepkens | 7 – Ross | 7 – Vieira | Jon M. Huntsman Center; Salt Lake City, UT |
| November 7, 2024*; 5:30 p.m., ESPN+ | | Weber State | W 86–46 | 2–0 | 22 – Tourè | 5 – Tied | 8 – Vieira | Jon M. Huntsman Center (3,154); Salt Lake City, UT |
| November 14, 2024*; 5:00 p.m., BTN | | at Northwestern | L 69–71 | 2–1 | 15 – Johnson | 10 – Johnson | 4 – Tied | Welsh–Ryan Arena (1,114); Evanston, IL |
| November 18, 2023*; 7:00 p.m., ESPN+ | | McNeese | W 118–50 | 3–1 | 24 – Kneepkens | 8 – Tied | 7 – Vieira | Jon M. Huntsman Center (3,129); Salt Lake City, UT |
| November 22, 2023*; 7:00 p.m., ESPN+ | | Saint Joseph's | W 72–71 ^{OT} | 4–1 | 14 – Tied | 10 – Ross | 5 – Vieira | Jon M. Huntsman Center (1,901); Salt Lake City, UT |
| November 24, 2024*; 7:00 p.m., ESPN+ | | Montana State | W 72–53 | 5–1 | 19 – Kneepkens | 8 – Ross | 8 – Vieira | Jon M. Huntsman Center (3,102); Salt Lake City, UT |
| November 28, 2024*; 5:30 p.m., FloHoops | | vs. Mississippi State; Cayman Islands Classic | L 62–66 | 5–2 | 17 – Kneepkens | 6 – Ross | 4 – Vieira | John Gray Gymnasium (802); George Town, Cayman Islands |
| November 30, 2024*; 3:00 p.m., FloHoops | | vs. No. 3 Notre Dame; Cayman Islands Classic | W 78–67 | 6–2 | 16 – Kneepkens | 8 – Tied | 5 – Vieira | John Gray Gymnasium (885); George Town, Cayman Islands |
| December 4, 2024*; 7:00 p.m., ESPN+ | | vs. Utah State | W 87–34 | 7–2 | 17 – McQueen | 6 – Tied | 6 – McQueen | Delta Center (3,949); Salt Lake City, UT |
| December 8, 2024*; 2:00 p.m., ESPN+ | | Princeton | W 79–76 | 8–2 | 19 – Kneepkens | 7 – Ross | 6 – Vieira | Jon M. Huntsman Center (4,062); Salt Lake City, UT |
| December 14, 2024*; 7:30 p.m., BTN | | at Washington | W 67–57 | 9–2 | 24 – Kneepkens | 7 – Kneepkens | 4 – Vieira | Alaska Airlines Arena (2,695); Seattle, WA |
Big 12 regular season
| December 21, 2024; 4:00 p.m, ESPN+ | | Arizona State | W 102–82 | 10–2 (1–0) | 24 – Kneepkens | 9 – Tourè | 8 – Vieira | Jon M. Huntsman Center (3,787); Salt Lake City, UT |
| December 31, 2024; 12:00 p.m., ESPN+ | | at Arizona | W 69–48 | 11–2 (2–0) | 18 – Kneepkens | 11 – Ross | 11 – Vieira | McKale Center (6,958); Tucson, AZ |
| January 5, 2025; 4:30 p.m., ESPN2 | | at Iowa State | W 75–67 | 12–2 (3–0) | 24 – Toure | 9 – Toure | 6 – Johnson | Hilton Coliseum (9,251); Ames, IA |
| January 8, 2025; 7:00 p.m., ESPN+ | No. 22 | No. 12 Kansas State | L 47–71 | 12–3 (3–1) | 12 – Kneepkens | 7 – Tourè | 3 – Johnson | Jon M. Huntsman Center (4,746); Salt Lake City, UT |
| January 11, 2025; 1:30 p.m., ESPN+ | No. 22 | Houston | W 69–42 | 13–3 (4–1) | 22 – Toure | 12 – Toure | 7 – Kneepkens | Jon M. Huntsman Center (4,326); Salt Lake City, UT |
| January 14, 2025; 6:00 p.m., ESPN+ | No. 23 | at Baylor | L 61–70 | 13–4 (4–2) | 17 – Tied | 7 – Tied | 4 – Vieira | Foster Pavilion (3,216); Waco, TX |
| January 17, 2025; 5:30 p.m., ESPN+ | No. 23 | at No. 10 TCU | L 73–81 | 13–5 (4–3) | 26 – Kneepkens | 8 – Johnson | 5 – Johnson | Schollmaier Arena (2,735); Fort Worth, TX |
| January 22, 2025; 7:00 p.m., ESPN+ | | Kansas | W 79–61 | 14–5 (5–3) | 30 – Kneepkens | 10 – Kneepkens | 8 – Kneepkens | Jon M. Huntsman Center (3,531); Salt Lake City, UT |
| January 25, 2025; 2:30 p.m., ESPNU | | at BYU; Rivalry | W 81–76 | 15–5 (6–3) | 32 – Kneepkens | 8 – Tied | 4 – Vieira | Marriott Center (4,889); Provo, UT |
| January 31, 2025; 6:30 p.m., FS1 | | Arizona | W 67–58 | 16–5 (7–3) | 28 – Kneepkens | 11 – Toure | 4 – Johnson | Jon M. Huntsman Center (4,431); Salt Lake City, UT |
| February 5, 2025; 5:00 p.m., ESPN+ | | at Texas Tech | W 70–64 | 17–5 (8–3) | 20 – Johnson | 11 – Toure | 5 – Kneepkens | United Supermarkets Arena (3,986); Lubbock, TX |
| February 8, 2025; 1:30 p.m., ESPN+ | | UCF | W 95–51 | 18–5 (9–3) | 32 – Kneepkens | 11 – Toure | 7 – Vieira | Jon M. Huntsman Center (5,909); Salt Lake City, UT |
| February 12, 2025; 7:00 p.m., ESPN+ | | Colorado | W 77–60 | 19–5 (10–3) | 16 – Kneepkens | 6 – Toure | 5 – Tied | Jon M. Huntsman Center (3,756); Salt Lake City, UT |
| February 15, 2025; 2:00 p.m., ESPN+ | | at Arizona State | W 98–62 | 20–5 (11–3) | 24 – Kneepkens | 12 – Kneepkens | 6 – Johnson | Desert Financial Arena; Tempe, AZ |
| February 18, 2025; 7:00 p.m., ESPN+ | | No. 24 Oklahoma State | L 64–68 | 20–6 (11–4) | 16 – Kneepkens | 7 – Johnson | 5 – Johnson | Jon M. Huntsman Center (3,882); Salt Lake City, UT |
| February 23, 2025; 12:00 p.m., ESPN+ | | at Cincinnati | W 92–65 | 21–6 (12–4) | 25 – Kneepkens | 6 – Toure | 5 – Vieira | Fifth Third Arena (2,015); Cincinnati, OH |
| February 26, 2025; 5:00 p.m., ESPN+ | | at No. 18 West Virginia | L 46–75 | 21–7 (12–5) | 12 – Toure | 9 – Toure | 2 – Tied | WVU Coliseum (4,471); Morgantown, WV |
| March 1, 2025; 1:30 p.m., ESPN+ | | BYU; Rivalry | W 76–73 ^{OT} | 22–7 (13–5) | 24 – Tourè | 14 – Tourè | 5 – Vieira | Jon M. Huntsman Center (8,242); Salt Lake City, UT |
Big 12 Women's Tournament
| March 6, 2025; 7:00 p.m., ESPN+ | (6) | vs. (14) Texas Tech; Second Round | L 64–75 | 22–8 | 23 – Kneepkens | 6 – Kneepkens | 6 – Kneepkens | T-Mobile Center (4,582); Kansas City, MO |
NCAA tournament - Birmingham Regional 2
| March 21, 2025*; 10:30 a.m., ESPN2 | (8 B2) | vs. (9 B2) Indiana; First Round | L 68–76 | 22–9 | 24 – Kneepkens | 11 – Tourè | 4 – Johnson | Colonial Life Arena; Columbia, SC |
*Non-conference game. ^{#}Rankings from AP Poll. (#) Tournament seedings in parentheses. All times are in Mountain Time.

== Rankings ==
Ranking movements Legend: ██ Increase in ranking ██ Decrease in ranking — = Not ranked RV = Received votes
| | Week | | | | | | | | | | | | | | | | | | | | |
| Poll | Pre | 1 | 2 | 3 | 4 | 5 | 6 | 7 | 8 | 9 | 10 | 11 | 12 | 13 | 14 | 15 | 16 | 17 | 18 | 19 | Final |
|---|---|---|---|---|---|---|---|---|---|---|---|---|---|---|---|---|---|---|---|---|---|
| AP | RV | RV | RV | — | | | | | RV | 22 | 23 | RV | RV | RV | RV | RV | RV | RV | — | — | |
| Coaches | RV | RV | RV | — | | | | | RV | 22 | 23 | RV | RV | RV | RV | RV | RV | RV | — | — | |

== See also ==
- 2024–25 Utah Utes men's basketball team
