= 2022–23 Utah Utes women's basketball team =

American college basketball season

2022–23 Utah Utes women's basketball

Pac-12 regular season co-champions

NCAA tournament, Sweet Sixteen
- Conference: Pac-12 Conference

Ranking
- Coaches: No. 8
- AP: No. 8
- Record: 27–5 (15–3 Pac–12)
- Head coach: Lynne Roberts (8th season)
- Associate head coach: Gavin Petersen
- Assistant coaches: Jerise Freeman; Joanna Reitz
- Home arena: Jon M. Huntsman Center

2022–23 Pac-12 Conference women's basketball standings
	Conf.				Overall
Team	W		L	PCT	W		L	PCT
No. 8 Utah	15	–	3	.833	27	–	5	.844
No. 5 Stanford	15	–	3	.833	29	–	6	.829
No. 21 Colorado	13	–	5	.722	25	–	9	.735
No. 14 UCLA	11	–	7	.611	27	–	10	.730
No. 25 Arizona	11	–	7	.611	22	–	10	.688
USC	11	–	7	.611	21	–	10	.677
No. 23 Washington State †	9	–	9	.500	23	–	11	.676
Oregon	7	–	11	.389	20	–	15	.571
Washington	7	–	11	.389	19	–	15	.559
California	4	–	14	.222	13	–	17	.433
Oregon State	4	–	14	.222	13	–	18	.419
Arizona State	1	–	17	.056	8	–	20	.286
† 2023 Pac-12 Tournament winner Rankings from AP poll

The 2022–23 Utah Utes women's basketball team represented the University of Utah during the 2022–23 NCAA Division I women's basketball season. The Utes, led by eight-year head coach Lynne Roberts, played their home games at the Jon M. Huntsman Center and competed as members of the Pac-12 Conference.

== Previous season ==
The Utes finished the season with a record of 21–12, and a 8–7 record in Pac-12 play to finish in sixth place. They advanced to championship of the Pac-12 women's tournament, where they lost to Stanford. They received an automatic bid to the NCAA Women's Tournament for the first time since 2011, where they defeated Arkansas in the first round. This was their first NCAA tournament win since 2009. They lost to Texas in the second round.

=== Departures ===
Utah departures
Name	Num	Pos.	Height	Year	Hometown	Reason for departure
Andreas Torres	3	F	6'2"	Senior	Terrebonne, QC	Graduated
Dru Gylten	10	G	5'11"	Senior	Rapid City, SD	Graduate transferred to South Dakota State
Brynna Maxwell	11	G	6'0"	Junior	Gig Harbor, WA	Transferred to Gonzaga
Kemery Martin	15	G	6'0"	Junior	Sandy, UT	Transferred to California
Maka Jackson	23	G	5'9"	Senior	Ewa Beach, HI	Graduated

=== Incoming ===
Utah incoming transfers
Name	Num	Pos.	Height	Year	Hometown	Previous school
Nene Sow	25	F	6'7"	Sophomore	Brussels, Belgium	Northeastern Oklahoma A&M
Alissa Pili	35	F	6'0"	Junior	Anchorage, AK	USC

==== Recruiting ====
There was no recruiting class of 2022.

== Roster ==
2022–23 Utah Utes women's basketball team
Players
Coaches

Pos.	#	Name	Height	Year	Previous school	Hometown
G	1	Isabel Palmer	5 ft 9 in (1.75 m)	Jr	BA Centre of Excellence	Newcastle, Australia
G	2	Ines Vieira	5 ft 6 in (1.68 m)	So	Quinta Lombos	Madeira Island, Portugal
G	3	Lani White	5 ft 11 in (1.8 m)	Fr	Mater Dei HS	Irvine, CA
G	5	Gianna Kneepkens	5 ft 11 in (1.8 m)	So	Duluth Marshall HS	Duluth, MN
G	13	Naya Ojukwu	6 ft 0 in (1.83 m)	Fr	Mountain View HS	Meridian, ID
F	22	Jenna Johnson	6 ft 2 in (1.88 m)	So	Wayzata HS	Medina, MN
G	24	Kennady McQueen	5 ft 10 in (1.78 m)	So	North Summit High School	Henefer, UT
C	25	Néné Sow	6 ft 8 in (2.03 m)	So	Northeastern Oklahoma A&M	Brussels, Belgium
F	32	Teya Sidberry	6 ft 1 in (1.85 m)	Fr	Judge Memorial HS	Salt Lake City, UT
F	34	Dasia Young	5 ft 11 in (1.8 m)	Jr	Nettleton HS; UT Martin	Jonesboro, AR
F	35	Alissa Pili (C)	6 ft 2 in (1.88 m)	Jr	Dimond HS; USC	Anchorage, AK
F	42	Peyton McFarland	6 ft 4 in (1.93 m)	Jr	Boise HS	Boise, ID
F	53	Kelsey Rees	6 ft 5 in (1.96 m)	So	BA Centre of Excellence	Glenelg, Australia

Head coach

- Lynne Roberts (Seattle Pacific)

Assistant coach(es)

- Gavin Petersen (Hawaiʻi)
- Jerise Freeman (Pacific)
- Joanna Reitz (Covenant)

Legend

- (C) Team captain
- (S) Suspended
- (I) Ineligible
- (W) Walk-on
- Injured
- Current redshirt

Roster

== Schedule and results ==
Date time, TV	Rank^{#}	Opponent^{#}	Result	Record	High points	High rebounds	High assists	Site (attendance) city, state
Exhibition
October 27, 2022*; 11:00 a.m.		Northwest Nazarene	W 119–62		22 – Sidberry	12 – Sidberry	5 – Young	Jon M. Huntsman Center (5,786); Salt Lake City, UT
November 1, 2022*; 7:00 p.m.		Westminster	W 99–52		16 – Kneepkens	10 – Sidberry	6 – Palmer	Jon M. Huntsman Center (933); Salt Lake City, UT
Regular season
November 7, 2022*; 5:30 p.m.		Idaho	W 88–63	1–0	27 – Pili	13 – Johnson	5 – Johnson	Jon M. Huntsman Center (1,058); Salt Lake City, UT
November 11, 2022*; 1:30 p.m.		Utah Valley	W 97–27	2–0	15 – McQueen	8 – Pili	5 – Vieira	Jon M. Huntsman Center (1,483); Salt Lake City, UT
November 13, 2022*; 7:00 p.m.		Southeastern Louisiana	W 99–62	3–0	20 – Johnson	7 – McQueen	8 – Vieira	Jon M. Huntsman Center (1,386); Salt Lake City, UT
November 16, 2022*; 7:00 p.m., P12N	No. 25	No. 16 Oklahoma	W 124–78	4–0	24 – Kneepkens	9 – McQueen	9 – Vieira	Jon M. Huntsman Center (2,521); Salt Lake City, UT
November 21, 2022*; 12:30 p.m., FloSports	No. 17	vs. Alabama; Baha Mar Hoops Pink Flamingo Championship	W 93–86	5–0	21 – Kneepkens	5 – Johnson	6 – Palmer	Baha Mar Convention Center; Nassau, Bahamas
November 23, 2022*; 5:00 p.m., FloSports	No. 17	vs. Ole Miss; Baha Mar Hoops Pink Flamingo Championship	W 69–67	6–0	21 – Pili	10 – Johnson	3 – Tied	Baha Mar Convention Center; Nassau, Bahamas
December 1, 2022*; 5:00 p.m., P12N/ESPN+	No. 16	at Mississippi Valley State; Pac-12/SWAC Legacy Series	W 109–42	7–0	28 – Pili	8 – Reeves	5 – Vieira	Harrison HPER Complex (1,206); Itta Bena, MS
December 10, 2022*; 5:00 p.m., BYUtv	No. 15	at BYU; Rivalry	W 76–59	8–0	28 – Pili	7 – Pili	3 – Tied	Marriott Center (2,326); Provo, UT
December 14, 2022; 3:00 p.m., P12N	No. 13	Colorado	W 85–58	9–0 (1–0)	25 – Pili	7 – Johnson	6 – Vieira	Jon M. Huntsman Center (1,894); Salt Lake City, UT
December 17, 2022*; 12:00 p.m.	No. 13	UC Riverside	W 92–45	10–0	18 – Johnson	6 – Tied	5 – Tied	Jon M. Huntsman Center (2,162); Salt Lake City, UT
December 20, 2022*; 5:30 p.m., ESPN+	No. 12	at Weber State	W 88–52	11–0	20 – Pili	9 – Pili	5 – Palmer	Dee Events Center (398); Ogden, UT
December 22, 2022*; 5:00 p.m., P12N	No. 12	Southern Utah	W 90–52	12–0	17 – Kneepkens	8 – Sidberry	7 – McQueen	Jon M. Huntsman Center (2,109); Salt Lake City, UT
December 30, 2022; 5:00 p.m., P12N	No. 11	at Washington State	W 71–66	13–0 (2–0)	20 – McQueen	6 – McQueen	3 – Johnson	Beasley Coliseum (887); Pullman, WA
January 1, 2023; 1:00 p.m., P12N	No. 11	at Washington	W 61–53	14–0 (3–0)	18 – Kneepkens	8 – Pili	5 – Palmer	Alaska Airlines Arena (2,286); Seattle, WA
January 6, 2023; 7:00 p.m., P12N	No. 8	at Colorado	L 67–77	14–1 (3–1)	17 – Johnson	6 – Kneepkens	3 – McQueens	CU Events Center (1,575); Boulder, CO
January 13, 2023; 7:00 p.m.	No. 10	Arizona State	W 2–0 Forfeit	14–1 (4–1)	–	–	–	Jon M. Huntsman Center; Salt Lake City, UT
January 15, 2023; 12:00 p.m., P12N	No. 10	No. 14 Arizona	W 80–79	15–1 (5–1)	27 – Pili	7 – Kneepkens	4 – Tied	Jon M. Huntsman Center (2,915); Salt Lake City, UT
January 20, 2023; 7:00 p.m., P12N	No. 8	at No. 4 Stanford	L 62–74	15–2 (5–2)	25 – Pili	12 – Johnson	5 – Johnson	Maples Pavilion (3,730); Stanford, CA
January 22, 2023; 5:00 p.m., P12N	No. 8	at California	W 87–62	16–2 (6–2)	20 – Tied	10 – Kneepkens	5 – Johnson	Haas Pavilion (1,332); Berkeley, CA
January 27, 2023; 7:00 p.m., P12N	No. 9	USC	W 83–73	17–2 (7–2)	21 – Pili	5 – Pili	4 – Pili	Jon M. Huntsman Center (3,251); Salt Lake City, UT
January 29, 2023; 12:00 p.m., P12N	No. 9	No. 8 UCLA	W 71–69	18–2 (8–2)	23 – Pili	9 – Pili	5 – Palmer	Jon M. Huntsman Center (3,211); Salt Lake City, UT
February 3, 2023; 7:00 p.m., P12N	No. 7	at Oregon State	W 75–73 ^{OT}	19–2 (9–2)	23 – Pili	8 – Kneepkens	4 – Palmer	Gill Coliseum (4,557); Corvallis, OR
February 5, 2023; 3:00 p.m., P12N	No. 7	at Oregon	W 100–92	20–2 (10–2)	30 – Pili	7 – Pili	6 – Tied	Matthew Knight Arena (6,289); Eugene, OR
February 10, 2023; 7:00 p.m., P12N	No. 7	Washington	W 92–69	21–2 (11–2)	19 – Kneepkens	7 – Rees	6 – Kneepkens	Jon M. Huntsman Center (3,725); Salt Lake City, UT
February 12, 2023; 12:00 p.m., P12N	No. 7	Washington State	W 73–59	22–2 (12–2)	15 – Pili	13 – Kneepkens	7 – Palmer	Jon M. Huntsman Center (3,268); Salt Lake City, UT
February 17, 2023; 7:00 p.m., P12N	No. 4	at No. 18 Arizona	L 72–82	22–3 (12–3)	26 – Pili	7 – Kneepkens	6 – Palmer	McKale Center (8,238); Tucson, AZ
February 19, 2023; 12:00 p.m., P12N	No. 4	at Arizona State	W 74–69	23–3 (13–3)	22 – Kneepkens	9 – McFarland	3 – McQueen	Desert Financial Arena (2,393); Tempe, AZ
February 23, 2023; 5:00 p.m., P12N	No. 8	California	W 101–79	24–3 (14–3)	26 – Pili	7 – McQueen	5 – Tied	Jon M. Huntsman Center (3,755); Salt Lake City, UT
February 25, 2023; 12:00 p.m., P12N	No. 8	No. 3 Stanford	W 84–78	25–3 (15–3)	28 – Kneepkens	6 – Young	4 – McQueen	Jon M. Huntsman Center (9,611); Salt Lake City, UT
Pac-12 Women's Tournament
March 2, 2023; 7:00 p.m., P12N	(2) No. 3	vs. (7) Washington State; Quarterfinals	L 58–66	25–4	18 – Kneepkens	5 – Sidberry	3 – Johnson	Michelob Ultra Arena; Paradise, NV
NCAA Women's Tournament
March 17, 2023*; 5:30 p.m., ESPNU	(2 G2) No. 8	(15 G2) Gardner–Webb; First Round	W 103–77	26–4	33 – Pili	9 – Kneepkens	8 – Pili	Jon M. Huntsman Center (7,130); Salt Lake City, UT
March 19, 2023*; 5:00 p.m., ESPN2	(2 G2) No. 8	(10 G2) Princeton; Second Round	W 63–56	27–4	28 – Pili	10 – Pili	3 – Pili	Jon M. Huntsman Center (8,663); Salt Lake City, UT
March 24, 2023*; 3:00 p.m., ESPN	(2 G2) No. 8	vs. (3 G2) No. 9 LSU; Sweet Sixteen	L 63–66	27–5	20 – Kneepkens	8 – Kneepkens	4 – McQueen	Bon Secours Wellness Arena (8,592); Greenville, SC
*Non-conference game. ^{#}Rankings from AP Poll. (#) Tournament seedings in parentheses. G2=Greenville 2. All times are in Mountain Time.

== Rankings ==
Ranking movements Legend: ██ Increase in ranking ██ Decrease in ranking RV = Received votes
	Week																				
Poll	Pre	1	2	3	4	5	6	7	8	9	10	11	12	13	14	15	16	17	18	19	Final
AP	RV	RV*	25	17	16	15	13	12	11	8	10	8	9	7	7	4	8	3	8	8	Not released
Coaches	RV	RV*	24^	19	16	14	13	12	11	8	8	8	9	7	7	5	7	4	8	9	8

*The preseason and week 1 polls were the same.
^Coaches did not release a week 2 poll.

== See also ==
- 2022–23 Utah Utes men's basketball team
