= Utah Utes =

Intercollegiate sports teams of the University of Utah

- University: University of Utah
- Nickname: Utes
- NCAA: Division I (FBS)
- Conference: Big 12 (primary); ASUN (men's lacrosse); RMISA (skiing)
- Athletic director: Mark Harlan
- Location: Salt Lake City, Utah
- Varsity teams: 19 (7 men's, 11 women's, and 1 co-ed)
- Football stadium: Rice-Eccles Stadium
- Basketball arena: Jon M. Huntsman Center
- Baseball stadium: Smith's Ballpark
- Colors: Red and white
- Mascot: Swoop
- Fight song: Utah Man
- Website: utahutes.com

The Utah Utes are the intercollegiate athletics teams that represent the University of Utah, located in Salt Lake City. The athletic department is named after the Ute tribe of Native Americans. The men's basketball team is known as the Runnin' Utes; the women's gymnastics team is known as the Red Rocks.

On August 4, 2023, Utah accepted an invite to join the Big 12 Conference effective August 2, 2024.

Formerly Utah competed in the Pac-12 Conference, after it was announced on June 17, 2010, that the Utes would join the conference in all sports, beginning in the 2011–2012 academic year. They are the third Pac-12 member to have previously spent time in the Western Athletic Conference (WAC), joining old conference rivals Arizona and Arizona State. They are also the first school to leave the Mountain West Conference (MW) since it was formed in 1999.

Utah offers a total of 19 varsity sports—seven for men, 11 for women, and one coeducational. Baseball, football, golf, and lacrosse are sponsored for men only. Beach volleyball, cross country, gymnastics, indoor track & field, indoor volleyball, outdoor track & field, soccer, and softball are sponsored for women only. Basketball, swimming & diving, and tennis are sponsored for both sexes. The coeducational sport is skiing; while schools have separate men's and women's squads, the NCAA awards a single national team championship. Utah's newest varsity sport is men's lacrosse, which played its first season in 2019 (2018–19 school year).

== Varsity sports ==
Big 12 logo in Utah's colors

Men's sports	Women's sports
Baseball	Basketball
Basketball	Beach volleyball
Football	Cross country
Golf	Gymnastics
Lacrosse	Soccer
Swimming and diving	Softball
Tennis	Swimming and diving
Hockey	Tennis
	Track and field^{†}
	Volleyball
Co-ed sports
Skiing
† – Track and field includes both indoor and outdoor

=== Baseball ===
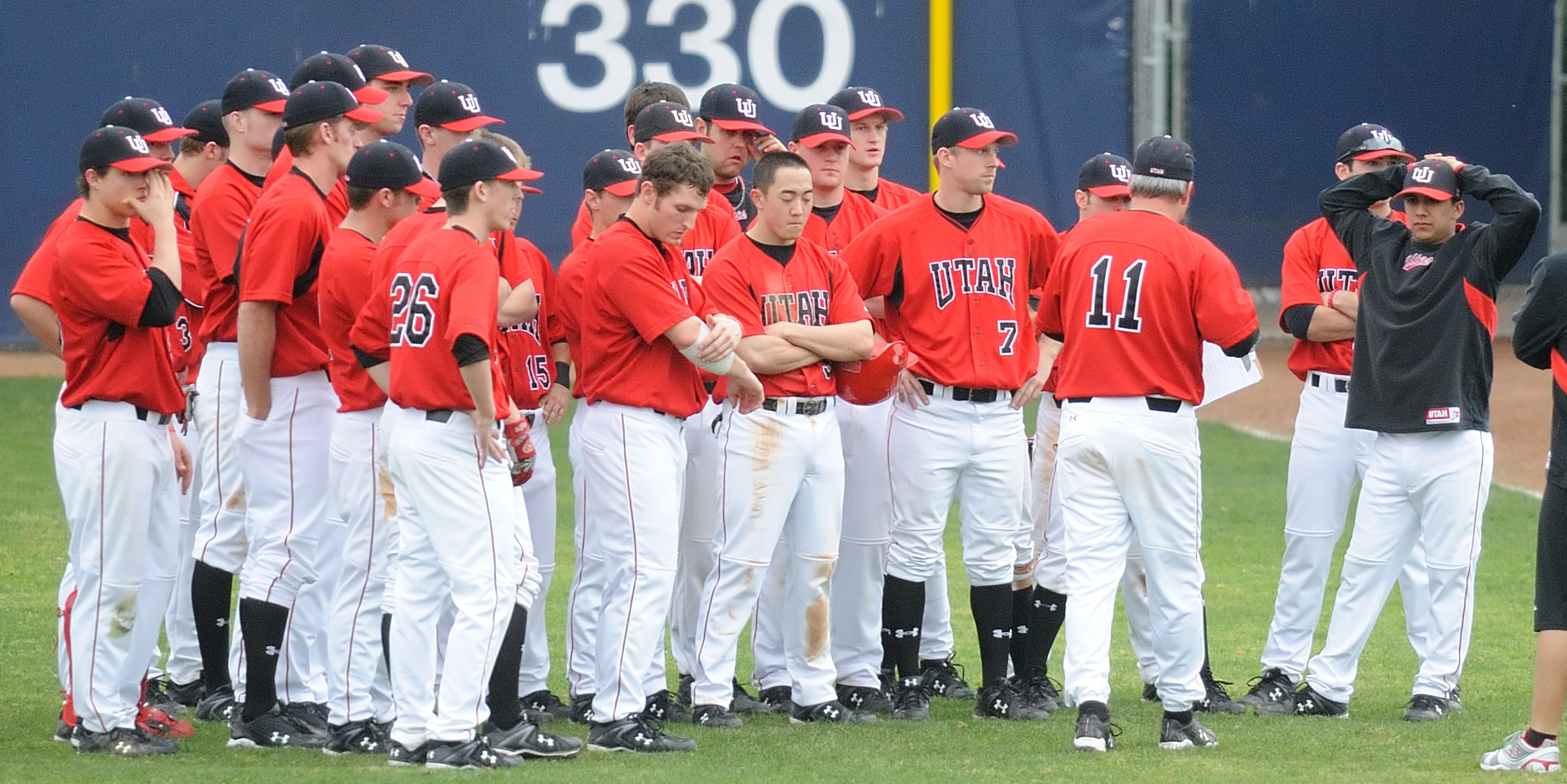
The Utes at George C. Page Stadium in 2009

The baseball team is made up of 32 Division I players from across the country and the world. 14 players are from Utah, 8 from Arizona, 4 from California, 2 from Nevada, and 1 from Louisiana, Oregon, Idaho, and the Netherlands. The Utes call Smith's Ballpark their home field. Smith's Ballpark was previously known as Franklin Covey Field but was changed in 2009 to Spring Mobile Ballpark, and again in 2014 to its present name. Smith's Ballpark is also the home of the Salt Lake Bees, Triple-A affiliate of Major League Baseball's Los Angeles Angels. The Utes are departing Smith's Ballpark after the 2024 season for a new on-campus ballpark to be called America First Ballpark.

The Utah baseball team has won 1 Mountain West Conference Championship, occurring in 2009. This gave the Utes a regional berth for the first time since the 1960s. In the past 3 years Utah baseball has seen 6 of their players get drafted in the annual Major League Baseball draft, including C. J. Cron, first baseman for the Colorado Rockies.

=== Men's basketball ===
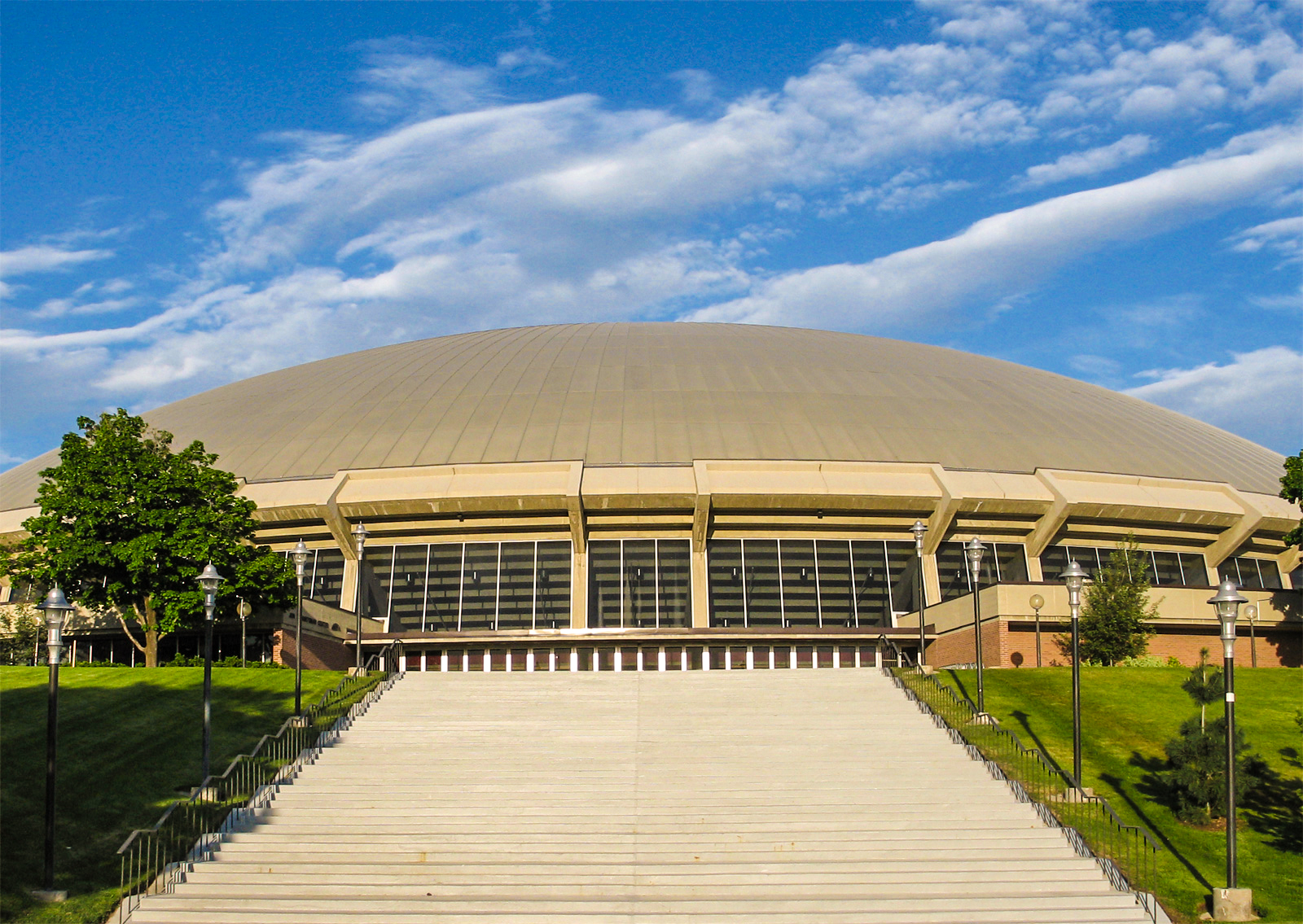
Jon M. Huntsman Center, home of Utah basketball programs

The Runnin' Utes basketball program has the 9th-most wins among college basketball programs. The Utes have made 27 NCAA Tournament appearances, which ranks 7th all-time, while the Utes 10 outright conference championships (28 championships overall) is the 5th best in NCAA history. In March 2021, Craig Smith was named head coach of the Utes.

Andrew Bogut was selected #1 in the 2005 NBA draft by the Milwaukee Bucks, making the University of Utah the only school in NCAA history to produce the #1 draft pick in both the NBA and NFL in the same year (Alex Smith). Other notable players that have gone on to play in the NBA are Delon Wright, Andre Miller, Keith Van Horn, Michael Doleac, Danny Vranes and Tom Chambers. The Utes have also been coached by several top NCAA coaches, including Vadal Peterson – the winningest coach in Utah basketball history, hall of fame coach Jack Gardner, Bill Foster and Rick Majerus.

Wataru Misaka — who led the Utes to the 1944 NCAA and 1947 NIT championships — later became the first person of color to play in modern professional basketball when he joined the New York Knicks, just months after Jackie Robinson had broken the color barrier in Major League Baseball for the Brooklyn Dodgers.

The Utes have played in four Final Fours, winning the 1944 NCAA Men's Division I Basketball Championship. Utah also added an NIT title in 1947. Jerry Chambers was named MVP of the 1966 Final Four in which Utah lost to eventual champion Texas Western (UTEP) and the legendary coach Don Haskins. They also played for the 1998 NCAA Men's Division I Basketball Championship, losing to the Kentucky Wildcats.

=== Women's basketball ===
The team is coached by Gavin Petersen, who was named head coach just before the start of the 2024-25 season when Lynne Roberts was named head coach of the WNBA's Los Angeles Sparks. The Utes have gone to the NCAA Women's Division I Basketball Championship tournament 15 times, and former coach Elaine Elliott has a 536–212 record (.717). The program's most successful season came in the 2005–2006 campaign. The Utes, who finished in 2nd place in the Mountain West Conference, won the conference tournament championship and advanced to the NCAA Tournament for the 14th time in school history. After getting by Middle Tennessee in the first round of the 2006 Women's NCAA Tournament, Utah surprised the 4th seeded Arizona State Sun Devils to advance to the Sweet 16 for only the second time in school history. There the Utes faced 8th seeded Boston College and gutted out a 3-point win, advancing to the Elite Eight for the first time in school history. Making the regional finals, Utah became the first women's team in Mountain West Conference history to ever do so. In doing so, the Utes would go on to play 2nd seeded, and eventual national champion, Maryland. The game went into OT, but Maryland prevailed and Utah's amazing run came to an end.

In the 2006 WNBA draft Utah guard Shona Thorburn was selected by Minnesota Lynx with the 7th pick and Kim Smith, a forward for the Utes, was selected 13th overall by the Sacramento Monarchs.

=== Football ===
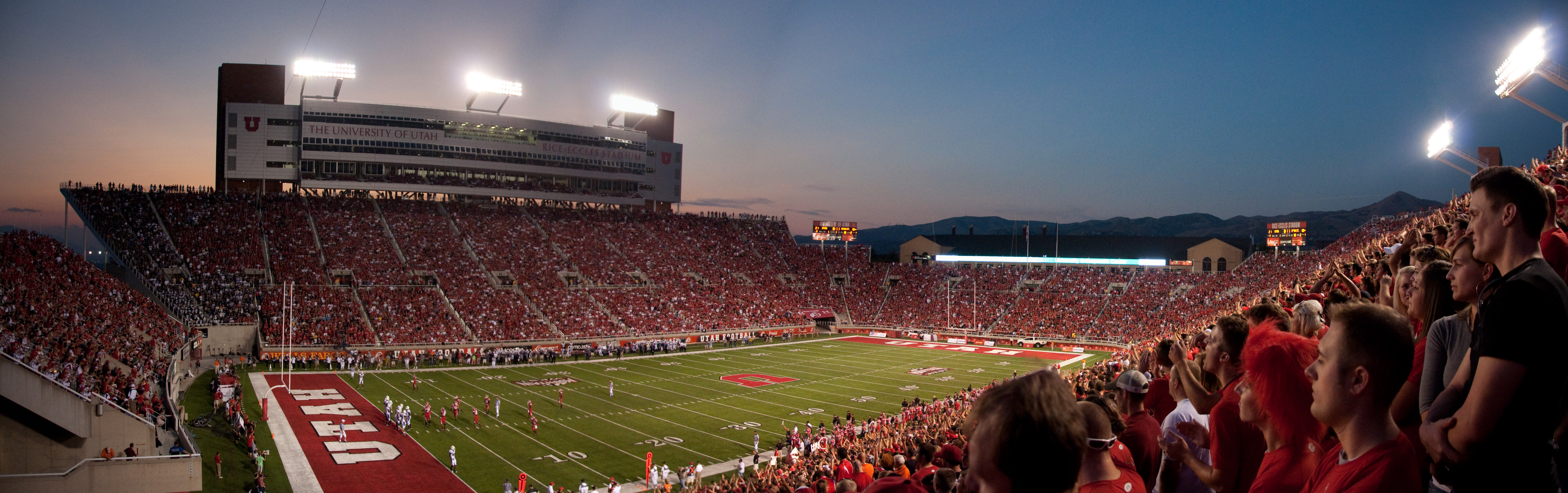
Rice-Eccles Stadium, Utah football's home venue

The University of Utah college football program began in 1892. Their current home stadium, Rice-Eccles Stadium, was built in 1998 on the site of their former home,Robert Rice Stadium. The Utes have a record of 13–4 (.765) in bowl games, which is the highest percentage in the nation for teams who have been to more than ten bowls. They have won twenty-four conference championships, including six in a row from 1928 to 1933 when they were part of the Rocky Mountain Athletic Conference.

After a 28-year stretch of not playing in a bowl game, Utah football experienced a resurgence in the early 1990s under head coach Ron McBride. The Utes played Washington State in the 1992 Copper Bowl, losing to the Cougars 31–28, and reached their peak under McBride when they finished the 1994 season ranked 10th in the Associated Press Top 25 poll and recorded a 16–13 victory over Arizona in the Freedom Bowl. The team was the first Mountain West Conference team, as well as the first team from a BCS non-AQ conference, to play in and win a BCS bowl.

Utah's Drum and Leather logo, though now used primarily for football

The Utes have a 171–89 (.658) record since the beginning of the 2000 season. Along the way, Utah engineered an eighteen-game winning streak. They produced an undefeated season in 2004, when the Utes were 12–0 and became the first school from a Bowl Championship Series non-AQ conference to play in a BCS bowl game, earning them the title of BCS Busters. The Utes played the Big East Conference champion Pittsburgh Panthers in the 2005 Fiesta Bowl, winning 35–7. The Utes finished the season ranked #4 in the AP poll. Later that year Alex Smith, who was Utah's quarterback for the 2003 and 2004 seasons, was drafted #1 by the San Francisco 49ers in the 2005 NFL draft. He became the first player in the state of Utah to ever be drafted first. This culminated in the University of Utah becoming the first school in history to produce two #1 professional draft picks in the same year when Andrew Bogut became the #1 pick in the 2005 NBA draft.

Utah is currently coached by Morgan Scalley who took over for Kyle Whittingham, who previously took over for Urban Meyer after Meyer left Utah for Florida after two seasons with the Utes. During the 2008 season, Utah again went undefeated with a 13–0 record, which included a 31–17 victory over the Alabama Crimson Tide in the 2009 Sugar Bowl. The Utes finished the season ranked #2 in the AP poll. During Utah's tenure in the MWC, Whittingham's Utes had gone 58–20 (.744) overall, 35–13 (.729) in conference play, and had won seven bowl games (the Fiesta Bowl, the Emerald Bowl, the Armed Forces Bowl, the Poinsettia Bowl (twice), the Sugar Bowl, and the Las Vegas Bowl). After having moved to the Pac-12, Whittingham's Utes had gone 86–50 (.632) overall, 54–44 (.551) in conference play, and won five bowl games (the Sun Bowl, the Las Vegas Bowl (twice), the Foster Farms Bowl, and the Heart of Dallas Bowl).

On June 17, 2010, the University of Utah officially accepted an invitation to join the Pac-12.

Notable players to have played for the University of Utah are Pro Football Hall of Fame member Larry Wilson, Super Bowl Head Coach Winner George Seifert, Manny Fernandez, Marv Bateman, Norm Chow, Scott Mitchell, Kevin Dyson, Andre Dyson, Chris Fuamatu-Ma'afala, Luther Elliss, Jamal Anderson, Mike Anderson, Bob Trumpy, Roy Jefferson, Paul Soliai, Barry Sims, Sione Pouha, Koa Misi, Chris Kemoeatu, Maake Kemoeatu, Jonathan Fanene, Jordan Gross of the Carolina Panthers, Steve Smith Sr. with the Panthers and Baltimore Ravens, Alex Smith of the Kansas City Chiefs and the Washington Football Team, Sean Smith of the Oakland Raiders, Robert Johnson of the Tennessee Titans and Eric Weddle of the San Diego Chargers.

=== Women's gymnastics ===
The women's gymnastic team, the Red Rocks, has won the national gymnastics championship title 10 times, beginning with an AIAW national championship title in 1981, more than any other university except the University of Georgia, to whom they finished second from 2006 to 2008. In the years when Utah does not place first, they are almost always #2 or #3. The ten-time national champion Utah gymnastics team has qualified for a record 31st-consecutive national championship. Utah is the only program to qualify for all 25 NCAA Championships. The Utes won the 2006 women's gymnastics attendance title, averaging 12,747 spectators to their six regular season home meets. It marked the second-highest attendance average in Utah and NCAA gymnastics history. Utah has won twenty-two of the last twenty-five gymnastics attendance titles. This is also one of the highest attendance averages for any women's college sport in the nation.

=== Skiing ===
The Utah men's skiing team won a national championship in 1981; the women, 1978. The teams won the combined national championship in 1983, 1984, 1986, 1987, 1988, 1993, 1996, 1997, 2003, 2017, 2019, 2021, 2022, 2023, 2025 and 2026.

=== Women's soccer ===
Utah's women's soccer team has appeared in the NCAA tournament six times, most recently in 2016. That season, the Utes managed the program's best-ever tournament result, progressing to the Round of 16 where they lost 1–0 to round hosts and eventual national champions USC.

=== Softball ===
Utah's softball team has appeared in six Women's College World Series, in 1976, 1982 (AIAW), 1985, 1991, 1994, and 2023.

=== Men's lacrosse ===
Utah's lacrosse team officially became a Division I lacrosse team in its 2019 inaugural season. After playing their first three seasons as an independent, the Utes joined the newly reinstated men's lacrosse league of the ASUN Conference in July 2021, and winning the regular season titles in both 2022 and 2023.

== Notable non varsity sports ==
=== Rugby ===
Utah rugby plays in Division 1 in the Pacific Athletic Conference, and plays its postseason in the Varsity Cup Championship. Utah has consistently fielded one of the top college rugby teams in the country, reaching the national championship game in 2002 and 2005, losing to rivals Cal both times, and reaching the national semifinals in 2006 and 2011. Utah finished the 2010 regular season ranked #2 in the nation. The success of the Utah rugby program has led to commercial success, with Utah rugby securing sponsorships from national companies such as Under Armour and New York Life. Utah rugby has been led since 2008 by head coach Blake Burdette, who played for the US national team at the 2007 Rugby World Cup.

Utah's rugby program has also been successful in rugby sevens. Utah has twice played in the Collegiate Rugby Championship, a tournament broadcast live on NBC every year. Utah won the inaugural 2010 tournament by defeating Cal in sudden death extra time. Utah placed third in the 2011 tournament, but narrowly failed to qualify for the 2012 tournament, losing 17–12 to Life University in the finals of the 2012 Las Vegas Invitational qualifying tournament. Utah finished second to Cal at the 2012 PAC 7s tournament, narrowly missing out on qualification to the 2012 USA Rugby Sevens Collegiate National Championships.

== Pageantry ==
=== Nickname ===
The "Utes" nickname comes from the Ute tribe, from which the state of Utah derives its name. The Ute tribe gave the University of Utah explicit permission to use the name for all its athletic teams, which allowed the school to keep the name when the NCAA began pressuring member schools to drop Native American-themed names. The men's basketball team is known as the "Runnin' Utes"; the women's basketball team used to be called the "Lady Utes," but now prefers to be referred to as the "Utes"; and the women's gymnastics team is known as the "Red Rocks."

Before 1972, various nicknames were attributed to Utah athletics; in addition to "Utes", these included "Crimson" and "Redskins" among others. In 1972, the university formally adopted "Utes" as its official nickname. It simultaneously discontinued using others, including "Redskins" as the term is often used as an ethnic slur and is considered offensive to Native Americans.

=== Mascot ===
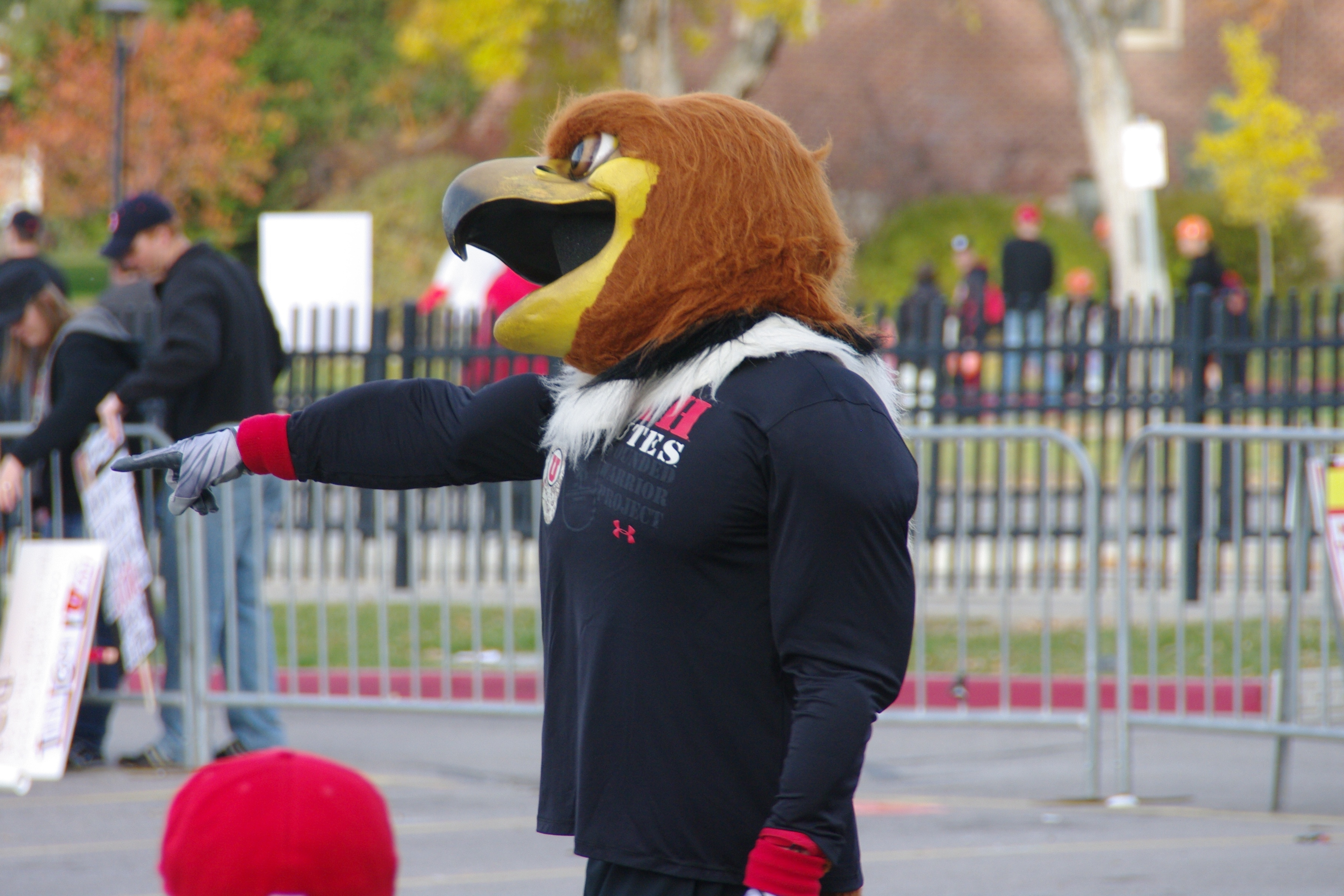
Swoop

Swoop, a red-tailed hawk, is the mascot of the Utah Utes sports teams. The university introduced Swoop with the consent of the tribal council of the Ute tribe in 1996. Originally the school's mascot was an American Indian, but was dropped. Later Hoyo, a cartoon Indian Boy, became an unofficial mascot, but was also dropped. During the 1980s a horseman known as the Crimson Warrior would ride onto the field before home football games and plant a lance into a bale of hay. The warrior was considered more a symbol of the school than a mascot.

=== Fight song ===
The Utah fight song is "Utah Man". Harvey Holmes and the football team wrote the song in 1904. The song was popularized during a football game at Colorado when Thomas Fitzpatrick heard four Utah students singing the song from the stands. It is sung to the tune of Solomon Levi, an old folk song. Many of the song's lyrics are identical to lyrics found in a Sigma Chi fraternity song.

==== "Utah Man" controversy ====
Due to some portions of the Utah fight song's lyrics potentially being interpreted as insensitive or discriminatory, there have been attempts to change portions of the song. Most notably, in 1984, a University of Utah vice president proposed changing the lyrics “Who am I, sir? A Utah man am I” to “Who am I, friend? A Utah fan am I”; in 2000, an entirely new song was written to replace “Utah Man” as the university's official fight song, but failed to gain popularity.

In addition to the repeated line “a Utah man am I”, the line “Our Co-eds are the fairest” has been criticized both for potentially objectifying women and seeming to prefer lighter skin tones. On April 22, 2014, members of the ASUU voted to push for changes to specific portions of the song's lyrics. These changes are summarized in the official ASUU Joint Resolution 11 as follows:

1. The Title of the Song—The title “Utah Man” can be viewed as referring only to male members of the campus community
2. Repetition of “Utah Man” throughout the song—can be interpreted by some as [a] reminder of a status given to male students or men as representative of all students, even though many students at the University of Utah do not identify as men or being a man
3. The phrase “Our Co-eds are the fairest” in the Song—this phrase can potentially be interpreted as objectifying women on campus while also supporting a hierarchy built on complexion and skin tone, privileging a light or “fair” appearance.

The proposal from ASUU was met with overwhelming opposition from students, faculty and alumni. In July 2014 university President David Pershing announced a compromise, highlighting optional alternate lyrics in the official, published fight song. "When printed officially by the university, this 2014 version of the fight song will be used, but historical renditions of the song will always be acceptable," Pershing said. "We encourage you to sing — loudly and with pride — whichever version resonates with you."

== Championships ==
=== NCAA team championships ===
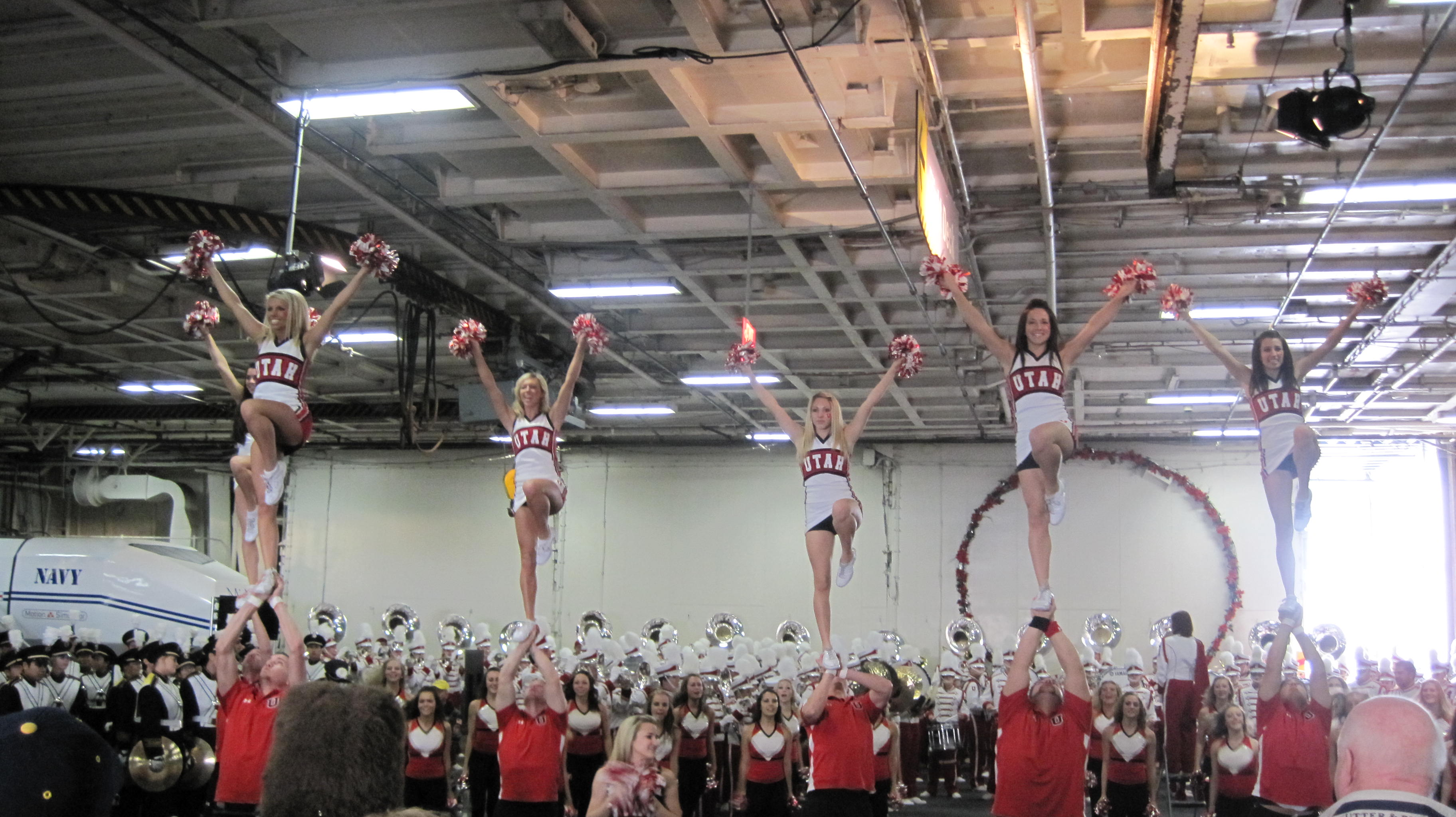
Cheerleaders at 2009 Poinsettia Bowl battle of the bands at USS Midway Museum.

Utah has won 27 NCAA team national championships.

- Men's (2)
  - Basketball (1): 1944
  - Skiing (1): 1981
- Women's (9)
  - Gymnastics (9): 1982, 1983, 1984, 1985, 1986, 1990, 1992, 1994, 1995
- Co-ed (16)
  - Skiing (16): 1983, 1984, 1986, 1987, 1988, 1993, 1996, 1997, 2003, 2017, 2019, 2021, 2022, 2023, 2025, 2026
- see also:
  - Pac-12 Conference NCAA championships
  - List of NCAA schools with the most NCAA Division I championships

=== Other national team championships ===
Below are seven national team titles that were not bestowed by the NCAA:

- Men's
  - Basketball (2): 1916 (AAU), 1947 (NIT)
  - Football (1): 2008 (selected by A&H and Wolfe math systems)
  - Skiing (1): 1947
- Women's AIAW championships:
  - Cross-country (1): 1981 (Div. II)
  - Gymnastics (1): 1981
  - Skiing (1): 1978
- see also:
  - List of NCAA schools with the most Division I national championships

== See also ==
- Rumble in the Rockies
- BYU–Utah rivalry
- Beehive Boot
