= Gianna Kneepkens =

American basketball player

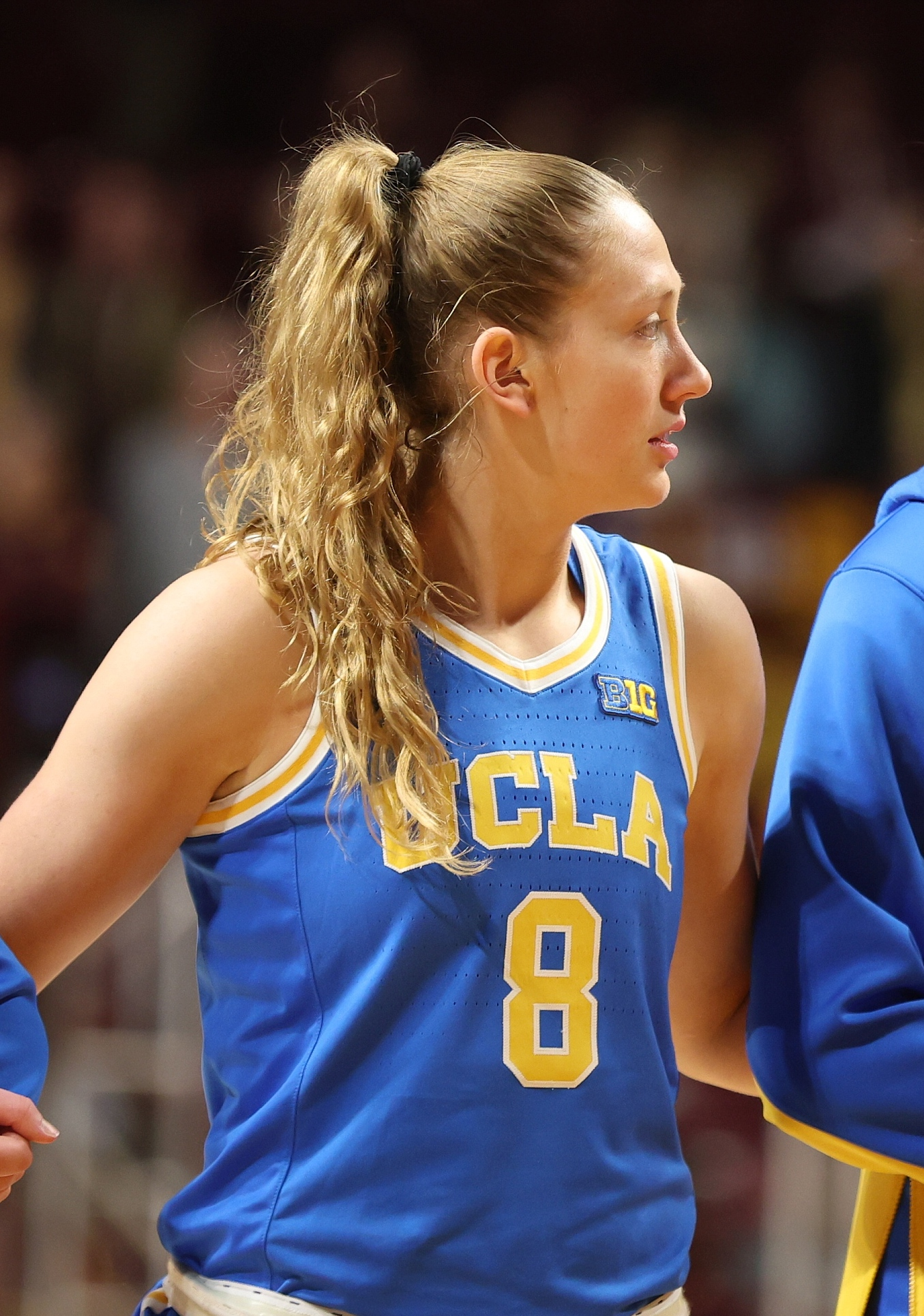
- Kneepkens with UCLA in 2026

No. 5 – Houston Comets
- Position: Guard
- League: WNBA

Personal information
- Born: March 4, 2003 (age 23) Duluth, Minnesota, U.S.
- Listed height: 5 ft 11 in (1.80 m)
- Listed weight: 174 lb (79 kg)

Career information
- High school: Marshall School (Duluth, Minnesota)
- College: Utah (2021–2025); UCLA (2025–2026)
- WNBA draft: 2026: 1st round, 15th overall pick
- Drafted by: Connecticut Sun
- Playing career: 2026–present

Career history
- 2026: Connecticut Sun
- 2026–2027: Tasmania Jewels
- 2027–present: Houston Comets

Career highlights
- NCAA champion (2026); Honorable-mention AP All-American (2026); Honorable mention WBCA All-American (2023); First-team All-Big 12 (2025); Second-team All-Big Ten (2026); 2× All-Pac-12 Team (2022, 2023); Pac-12 Freshman of the Year (2022); Pac-12 All-Freshman Team (2022); Minnesota Gatorade Player of the Year (2021)
- Stats at Basketball Reference
Medals
Women's basketball
Representing the United States
FIBA AmeriCup
Gold medal – first place	2025 Chile

Gianna Kneepkens (born March 4, 2003) is an American professional basketball player for the Houston Comets of the Women's National Basketball Association (WNBA). She played college basketball for the Utah Utes and UCLA Bruins. She was a starter on the 2025-26 Bruins team that won the 2026 NCAA Women's basketball championship.

== Early life and high school career ==
Gianna Kneepkens was born in Duluth, Minnesota to Donald and Betsy Kneepkens. The youngest of six siblings, Kneepkens grew up playing basketball against her five older brothers. She played for Marshall School in Duluth. As a varsity starter beginning in eighth grade, Kneepkens helped her team to two consecutive Minnesota State Tournament appearances. During her senior year of high school, she was the leading scorer in the nation, posting a Minnesota state-record 43.1 points per game. She also averaged 13.4 rebounds, 5.9 assists, and 5.7 steals. In her final high school game, Kneepkens scored 67 points, all-time single-game record in Minnesota. She earned numerous accolades including being named a Ms. Basketball Finalist and earning the 2021 Gatorade Minnesota Girls Basketball Player of the Year award, joining Paige Bueckers who won the award the year before. During her high school career, Kneepkens scored 3,704 points, which ranked fourth all-time in Minnesota state history at the time. She ultimately committed to playing college basketball for Utah.

== College career ==
=== Freshman season ===
Kneepkens made her debut for the Utes on November 10, 2021, against Lipscomb University. She later earned a starting role after coming off the bench and scoring 29 points against in-state rival BYU on December 4, 2021. During the season, Kneepkens went on to average 11.8 points per game, shooting 38.4% from the 3-point line and 87.1% from the free-throw line. Kneepkens was named Pac-12 Freshman of the Year, named to the All-Pac-12 team, and given Pac-12 All-Freshman honors.

=== Sophomore season ===
During her sophomore campaign, Kneepkens continued to see success, starting in every game and scoring an average of 15.3 points per game. She helped lead her team to a second consecutive NCAA Women's Basketball Tournament appearance. The Utes advanced to the Sweet 16 where Kneepkens scored a team-high 20 points in a loss to eventual NCAA champion LSU on March 24, 2023. She was again named to the All-Pac-12 team and was named a WBCA Coaches' Honorable Mention All-American.

=== Redshirt year ===
Just prior to her third season, she was named a Pac-12 Preseason All-Conference selection. She started in 8 games before suffering a season-ending Lisfranc foot injury during a game against BYU. She averaged 17.8 points per game, shooting a career-high 63.3% from the field and 54.0% from the 3-point line. She also reached 1,000 career points in just 62 games. She was granted a redshirt season by the NCAA for her injury.

=== Junior season ===
Prior to her redshirt junior year (2024–2025), she was named to the Naismith Trophy Women's Player of the Year Watch List. She returned to play November 4, 2024, scoring a team-high 18 points against Southern Utah.

On January 22, 2025, she posted a career high of 30 points, almost achieving a triple double with 10 rebounds, and eight assists, while shooting 66.7% from the field and setting a career high six 3-pointers (54.5%) in a 79-61 win over Kansas. In the same week against school rival’s BYU, she set a new career high of 32 points, making six 3-point shots (85.7%) and recording eight rebounds, two assists, and three steals, leading the team to an 81-76 victory. Based on these performances, she earned Big 12 women's basketball Player of the Week.

Kneepkens finished the regular season as a member of the 50–40–90 club, shooting 51.3% from the field, 45.3% from three-point range, and 90.5% from the free-throw line in 29 games, a feat achieved by only five players at the Power Four level. She was ultimately named First-team All-Big 12 and the 2025 Big 12 Scholar Athlete of the Year.

Following the conclusion of the 2024–2025 season, Kneepkens announced she was entering into the NCAA transfer portal as a graduate transfer with one year of eligibility remaining. She was noted as one of the top transfer prospects in the nation, making official visits to Oklahoma, South Carolina, Texas, and UCLA.

=== Senior season ===
On May 1, 2025, Kneepkens announced she would transfer to UCLA for her final year of eligibility. Prior to the season, she was named to the preseason watchlist for the 2026 Naismith Trophy College Women's Player of the Year and the Ann Meyers Drysdale Award. She made her debut for UCLA on November 3, 2025 in a win over San Diego State University.

In the final game of the 2025–26 regular season, Kneepkens scored 14 points in a win over rival University of Southern California, surpassing 2,000 career points and becoming, along with teammate Charlisse Leger-Walker, one of two Bruins to reach the milestone in the same game. The victory capped UCLA’s 28–1 overall record and perfect 18–0 Big Ten mark, making the Bruins the first team to complete an undefeated Big Ten season since Maryland in 2014–15 and secured the program the No. 1 seed in the Big Ten Conference tournament. Kneepkens and her team went on to win the 2026 NCAA Division I women's basketball tournament, UCLA's first NCAA women's basketball title. Kneepkens set UCLA single-season records for free throw percentage (.933) and 3-point shots made (87).

== Professional career ==
On April 13, 2026, Kneepkens was drafted in the first round, 15th overall, by the Connecticut Sun in the 2026 WNBA draft. She made her WNBA debut May 8, 2026, scoring 7 points and recording 5 rebounds against the New York Liberty.

Kneepkens announced in July 2026 that she had signed with the Tasmania Jewels for the 2026–2027 WNBL season, intending to play in the WNBA offseason.

== Personal life ==
In 2023 and 2025, Kneepkens attended Kelsey Plum's Dawg Class, an Under Armour-sponsored camp to help top women college athletes transition from collegiate to professional basketball.

== Career statistics ==
Legend
GP	Games played	GS	Games started	MPG	Minutes per game	RPG	Rebounds per game
APG	Assists per game	SPG	Steals per game	BPG	Blocks per game	PPG	Points per game
TO	Turnovers per game	FG%	Field-goal percentage	3P%	3-point field-goal percentage	FT%	Free-throw percentage
**Bold**	Career best	°	League leader

=== College ===
Year	Team	GP	GS	MPG	FG%	3P%	FT%	RPG	APG	SPG	BPG	TO	PPG
2021–22	Utah	33	25	23.7	44.6	38.4	87.1	4.4	1.2	0.7	0.4	**1.1**	11.8
2022–23	Utah	32	32	28.3	49.8	42.3	83.1	5.2	2.1	0.9	**0.5**	1.6	15.3
2023–24	Utah	8	8	25.1	**63.3**	**54.0**	78.9	**5.5**	**3.9**	**2.0**	0.3	2.3	17.8
2024–25	Utah	31	31	**30.1**	50.4	44.8°	89.0°	5.0	3.0	1.0	0.3	2.4	**19.3**
2025–26	UCLA	**38**	**37**	28.2	49.3	42.9	**93.3°**	3.1	2.9	1.1	0.2	1.2	12.8
**Career**		142	133	27.4	49.5	43.1	86.9	4.4	2.4	1.0	0.3	1.6	14.8
Statistics retrieved from Sports-Reference.
