= 2023–24 Utah Utes women's basketball team =

American college basketball season

2023–24 Utah Utes women's basketball

Great Alaska Shootout champions

NCAA tournament, Second Round
- Conference: Pac-12 Conference

Ranking
- Coaches: No. 22
- AP: No. 22
- Record: 23–11 (11–7 Pac–12)
- Head coach: Lynne Roberts (9th season)
- Associate head coach: Gavin Petersen
- Assistant coaches: Jerise Freeman; Jordan Sullivan
- Home arena: Jon M. Huntsman Center

2023–24 Pac-12 Conference women's basketball standings
	Conf.				Overall
Team	W		L	PCT	W		L	PCT
No. 9 Stanford	15	–	3	.833	30	–	6	.833
No. 5 USC †	13	–	5	.722	29	–	6	.829
No. 10 UCLA	13	–	5	.722	27	–	7	.794
No. 8 Oregon State	12	–	6	.667	27	–	8	.771
No. 15 Colorado	11	–	7	.611	24	–	10	.706
No. 22 Utah	11	–	7	.611	23	–	11	.676
Arizona	8	–	10	.444	18	–	16	.529
California	7	–	11	.389	19	–	15	.559
Washington State	7	–	11	.389	21	–	15	.583
Washington	6	–	12	.333	16	–	15	.516
Arizona State	3	–	15	.167	11	–	20	.355
Oregon	2	–	16	.111	11	–	21	.344
† 2024 Pac-12 tournament winner Rankings from AP Poll

The 2023–24 Utah Utes women's basketball team represented the University of Utah during the 2023–24 NCAA Division I women's basketball season. The Utes, led by ninth-year head coach Lynne Roberts, played their home games at the Jon M. Huntsman Center and competed as members of the Pac-12 Conference.

This was the last season that Utah played in the Pac-12 Conference before moving to the Big 12 Conference.

== Previous season ==
The Utes finished the season with a record of 27–5, and a 15–3 record in Pac-12 play to win a share of the Pac-12 Regular Season championship with Stanford. They lost in the quarterfinals of the Pac-12 women's tournament to Washington State. They received an at-large bid to the NCAA Women's Tournament as a #2 seed in the Greenville Regional 2, where they defeated Gardner–Webb in the first round, and Princeton in the second round to advance to the Sweet Sixteen for the first time since 2006, where they lost to the National Champion LSU.

== Offseason ==
=== Departures ===
Utah departures
Name	Num	Pos.	Height	Year	Hometown	Reason for departure
Naya Ojukwu	13	G	6'0"	Freshman	Merdian, ID	Transferred to Gonzaga
Teya Sidberry	32	F	6'1"	Freshman	Salt Lake City, UT	Transferred to Boston College
Peyton McFarland	42	F	6'4"	Junior	Boise, ID	Transferred to Houston
Kelsey Rees	53	F	6'5"	Sophomore	Glenelg, Australia	Transferred to Oregon State

=== Incoming ===
Utah incoming transfers
Name	Num	Pos.	Height	Year	Hometown	Previous school
Alyssa Blanck	15	F	6'2"	(redshirt) Freshman	Holladay, UT	BYU
Maty Wilke	23	G	5'10"	(redshirt) Sophomore	Beaver Dam, WI	Wisconsin
Sam Crispe	44	F	6'2"	Sophomore	Castle Pines, CO	Boston University

==== Recruiting class of 2024 ====
College recruiting (2024)
Name	Hometown	School	Height	Weight	Commit date
Brooke Walker; PG	Centreville, VA	Andover High School	5 ft 8 in (1.73 m)	N/A	
Brooke Walker; PG	Recruit ratings: ESPN: (92)				
Kylie Ray; G	La Crescenta, CA	Crescenta Valley High School	5 ft 8 in (1.73 m)	N/A	
Kylie Ray; G	Recruit ratings: ESPN: (91)				
Overall recruit ranking:
Note: In many cases, Scout, Rivals, 247Sports, On3, and ESPN may conflict in their listings of height and weight.; In these cases, the average was taken. ESPN grades are on a 100-point scale.; Sources: "2024 Player Commits". ESPN. Archived from the original on November 22, 2023.

== Roster ==
2023–24 Utah Utes women's basketball team
Players
Coaches

Pos.	#	Name	Height	Year	Previous school	Hometown
G	1	Isabel Palmer	5 ft 9 in (1.75 m)	Sr	BA Centre of Excellence	Newcastle, Australia
G	2	Inês Vieira	5 ft 6 in (1.68 m)	Jr	Quinta Lombos	Madeira Island, Portugal
G	3	Lani White	5 ft 11 in (1.8 m)	So	Mater Dei HS	Irvine, CA
G	5	Gianna Kneepkens	6 ft 0 in (1.83 m)	Jr	Duluth Marshall HS	Duluth, MN
F	11	Daniela Falcon Hernandez	6 ft 2 in (1.88 m)	Fr		Las Palmas Gran Canaria, Spain
F	15	Alyssa Blanck	6 ft 2 in (1.88 m)	RS Fr	Olympus HS; BYU	Holladay, UT
F	20	Reese Ross	6 ft 1 in (1.85 m)	Fr	St. Thomas More HS	Rapid City, SD
F	22	Jenna Johnson	6 ft 2 in (1.88 m)	Jr	Wayzata HS	Medina, MN
G	23	Maty Wilke	5 ft 10 in (1.78 m)	RS So	Beaver Dam HS; Wisconsin	Beaver Dam, WI
G	24	Kennady McQueen	5 ft 10 in (1.78 m)	Jr	North Summit High School	Henefer, UT
C	25	Néné Sow	6 ft 8 in (2.03 m)	Jr	Northeastern Oklahoma A&M	Brussels, Belgium
F	34	Dasia Young	5 ft 11 in (1.8 m)	Sr	Nettleton HS; UT Martin	Jonesboro, AR
F	35	Alissa Pili (C)	6 ft 2 in (1.88 m)	Sr	Dimond HS; USC	Anchorage, AK
F	44	Samantha Crispe	6 ft 2 in (1.88 m)	So	Arapahoe HS; Boston University	Castle Pines, CO

Head coach

- Lynne Roberts (Seattle Pacific)

Assistant coach(es)

- Gavin Petersen (Hawaiʻi)
- Jerise Freeman (Pacific)
- Jordan Sullivan (Montana)

Legend

- (C) Team captain
- (S) Suspended
- (I) Ineligible
- (W) Walk-on
- Injured
- Current redshirt

Roster

== Schedule and results ==
Date time, TV	Rank^{#}	Opponent^{#}	Result	Record	High points	High rebounds	High assists	Site (attendance) city, state
Exhibition
October 18, 2023*; 5:00 p.m.	No. 5	CSU Pueblo	W 96–44		20 – Pili	8 – Kneepkens	8 – Kneepkens	Jon M. Huntsman Center (3,689); Salt Lake City, UT
October 30, 2023*; 5:00 p.m.	No. 5	Northwest Nazarene	W 125–58		25 – Ross	13 – Ross	5 – McQueen	Jon M. Huntsman Center (3,389); Salt Lake City, UT
Non-conference regular season
November 6, 2023*; 4:00 p.m.	No. 5	Mississippi Valley State	W 104–45	1–0	26 – Pili	8 – Kneepkens	8 – Kneepkens	Jon M. Huntsman Center (3,830); Salt Lake City, UT
November 9, 2023*; 7:00 p.m.	No. 5	South Carolina State; Preseason WNIT	W 108–48	2–0	21 – Palmer	10 – Pili	6 – Tied	Jon M. Huntsman Center (3,935); Salt Lake City, UT
November 14, 2023*; 5:30 p.m., ESPN+	No. 4	at No. 21 Baylor; Preseason WNIT	L 77–84	2–1	22 – Pili	10 – Johnson	3 – Tied	Ferrell Center (4,808); Waco, TX
November 18, 2023*; 9:30 p.m.	No. 4	at Alaska Anchorage; Great Alaska Shootout semifinals	W 101–57	3–1	22 – Kneepkens	11 – Ross	14 – Vieira	Alaska Airlines Center (3,711); Anchorage, AK
November 19, 2023*; 9:30 p.m.	No. 4	vs. Eastern Kentucky; Great Alaska Shootout championship	W 117–72	4–1	28 – Pili	9 – Kneepkens	7 – Vieira	Alaska Airlines Center (2,329); Anchorage, AK
November 24, 2023*; 7:30 p.m.	No. 10	Merrimack	W 98–34	5–1	22 – Pili	11 – Ross	11 – Vieira	Jon M. Huntsman Center (4,375); Salt Lake City, UT
November 28, 2023*; 11:00 a.m.	No. 12	Carroll College	W 100–44	6–1	21 – Pili	8 – Johnson	6 – McQueen	Jon M. Huntsman Center (6,717); Salt Lake City, UT
December 2, 2023*; 7:00 p.m., P12N	No. 12	BYU; Rivalry	W 87–68	7–1	23 – Pili	7 – Johnson	12 – Vieira	Jon M. Huntsman Center (6,182); Salt Lake City, UT
December 7, 2023*; 5:00 p.m., ESPN+	No. 11	at Saint Joseph's	W 74–48	8–1	31 – Pili	9 – Johnson	8 – Vieira	Hagan Arena (646); Philadelphia, PA
December 10, 2023*; 12:30 p.m., ESPN	No. 11	vs. No. 1 South Carolina; Basketball Hall of Fame Women's Showcase	L 69–78	8–2	37 – Pili	7 – Johnson	7 – Vieira	Mohegan Sun Arena; Uncasville, CT
December 16, 2023*; 5:00 p.m., ESPN+	No. 11	at Southern Utah	W 96–60	9–2	20 – Pili	6 – Tied	6 – Tied	America First Event Center (715); Cedar City, UT
December 21, 2023*; 12:00 p.m.	No. 11	Weber State	W 89–36	10–2	19 – Pili	10 – Johnson	9 – Vieira	Jon M. Huntsman Center (4,442); Salt Lake City, UT
Pac-12 regular season
December 30, 2023; 1:00 p.m., P12N	No. 12	at No. 8 Colorado	L 65–76	10–3 (0–1)	27 – Pili	10 – Pili	5 – Pili	CU Events Center (7,383); Boulder, CO
January 5, 2024; 7:00 p.m., P12N	No. 15	at Arizona State	W 58–41	11–3 (1–1)	12 – McQueen	7 – Young	5 – McQueen	Desert Financial Arena (1,871); Tempe, AZ
January 7, 2024; 12:00 p.m., P12N	No. 15	at Arizona	L 70–71 ^{OT}	11–4 (1–2)	18 – Pili	8 – Tied	5 – Vieira	McKale Center (7,385); Tucson, AZ
January 12, 2024; 6:00 p.m., P12N	No. 19	No. 8 Stanford	L 64–66	11–5 (1–3)	16 – Pili	8 – Ross	5 – McQueen	Jon M. Huntsman Center (5,608); Salt Lake City, UT
January 14, 2024; 12:00 p.m., P12N	No. 19	California	W 93–56	12–5 (2–3)	19 – Vieira	10 – Ross	5 – Tied	Jon M. Huntsman Center (4,520); Salt Lake City, UT
January 19, 2024; 7:00 p.m., P12N	No. 20	No. 6 USC	W 78–58	13–5 (3–3)	37 – Pili	7 – Vieira	6 – Tied	Jon M. Huntsman Center (5,561); Salt Lake City, UT
January 22, 2024; 5:00 p.m., ESPN2	No. 16	No. 2 UCLA	W 94–81 ^{OT}	14–5 (4–3)	21 – McQueen	9 – McQueen	5 – Vieira	Jon M. Huntsman Center (5,261); Salt Lake City, UT
January 26, 2024; 8:00 p.m., P12N	No. 16	at Oregon	W 58–48	15–5 (5–3)	16 – Pili	10 – Johnson	5 – Vieira	Matthew Knight Arena (6,965); Eugene, OR
January 28, 2024; 1:00 p.m., P12N	No. 16	at No. 25 Oregon State	L 66–91	15–6 (5–4)	28 – Pili	7 – McQueen	9 – Vieira	Gill Coliseum (5,024); Corvallis, OR
February 2, 2024; 8:00 p.m., P12N	No. 20	at Washington	W 83–65	16–6 (6–4)	31 – Pili	7 – McQueen	9 – McQueen	Alaska Airlines Arena (3,413); Seattle, WA
February 4, 2024; 1:00 p.m., P12N	No. 20	at Washington State	W 73–61	17–6 (7–4)	15 – Pili	8 – Johnson	4 – McQueen	Beasley Coliseum (1,700); Pullman, WA
February 9, 2024; 7:00 p.m., P12N	No. 20	No. 17 Oregon State	L 44–58	17–7 (7–5)	14 – McQueen	10 – Johnson	5 – Vieira	Jon M. Huntsman Center (6,288); Salt Lake City, UT
February 11, 2024; 12:00 p.m., P12N	No. 20	Oregon	W 70–48	18–7 (8–5)	20 – Johnson	8 – Pili	10 – Vieira	Jon M. Huntsman Center (4,762); Salt Lake City, UT
February 16, 2024; 6:00 p.m., P12N	No. 22	No. 8 Colorado	W 77–76	19–7 (9–5)	18 – Pili	8 – Vieira	7 – Vieira	Jon M. Huntsman Center (5,999); Salt Lake City, UT
February 22, 2024; 7:30 p.m., ESPN	No. 18	at No. 12 UCLA	L 52–82	19–8 (9–6)	20 – Pili	11 – Pili	3 – Vieira	Pauley Pavilion (3,711); Los Angeles, CA
February 25, 2024; 1:00 p.m., P12N	No. 18	at No. 7 USC	W 74–68	20–8 (10–6)	23 – Pili	9 – Pili	9 – Johnson	Galen Center (7,129); Los Angeles, CA
February 29, 2024; 3:00 p.m., P12N	No. 18	Washington State	W 82–67	21–8 (11–6)	22 – McQueen	12 – Pili	6 – Vieira	Jon M. Huntsman Center (4,691); Salt Lake City, UT
March 2, 2024; 12:00 p.m., P12N	No. 18	Washington	L 47–62	21–9 (11–7)	17 – Wilke	10 – Pili	4 – Vieira	Jon M. Huntsman Center (5,969); Salt Lake City, UT
Pac-12 Women's Tournament
March 6, 2024; 9:30 p.m., P12N	(6) No. 22	vs. (11) Arizona State; First Round	W 71–60	22–9	20 – Pili	11 – Pili	4 – Tied	MGM Grand Garden Arena (4,372); Paradise, NV
March 7, 2024; 9:30 p.m., P12N	(6) No. 22	vs. (3) No. 7 UCLA; Quarterfinals	L 57–67	22–10	16 – Pili	7 – Wilke	4 – Tied	MGM Grand Garden Arena (4,901); Paradise, NV
NCAA Women's Tournament
March 23, 2024*; 8:00 p.m., ESPNU	(5 P4) No. 21	vs. (12 P4) South Dakota State; First round	W 68–54	23–10	26 – Pili	10 – Johnson	6 – McQueen	McCarthey Athletic Center (6,000); Spokane, WA
March 25, 2024*; 8:30 p.m., ESPN2	(5 P4) No. 21	at (4 P4) No. 16 Gonzaga; Second round	L 66–77	23–11	35 – Pili	7 – Tied	6 – Vieira	McCarthey Athletic Center (6,000); Spokane, WA
*Non-conference game. ^{#}Rankings from AP Poll. (#) Tournament seedings in parentheses. Portland 4=P4. All times are in Mountain Time.

== Rankings ==
Ranking movements Legend: ██ Increase in ranking ██ Decrease in ranking т = Tied with team above or below
	Week																				
Poll	Pre	1	2	3	4	5	6	7	8	9	10	11	12	13	14	15	16	17	18	19	Final
AP	5	4	10т	12	11	11	11	12	15	19	20	16	20	20	22	18	18	22	20	21	22
Coaches	7	4	8	6	7	10	10	10	12т	18	20	14	20	21	22	19	18	22	22	22	22

== See also ==
- 2023–24 Utah Utes men's basketball team
