= Alissa Pili =

American basketball player (born 2001)

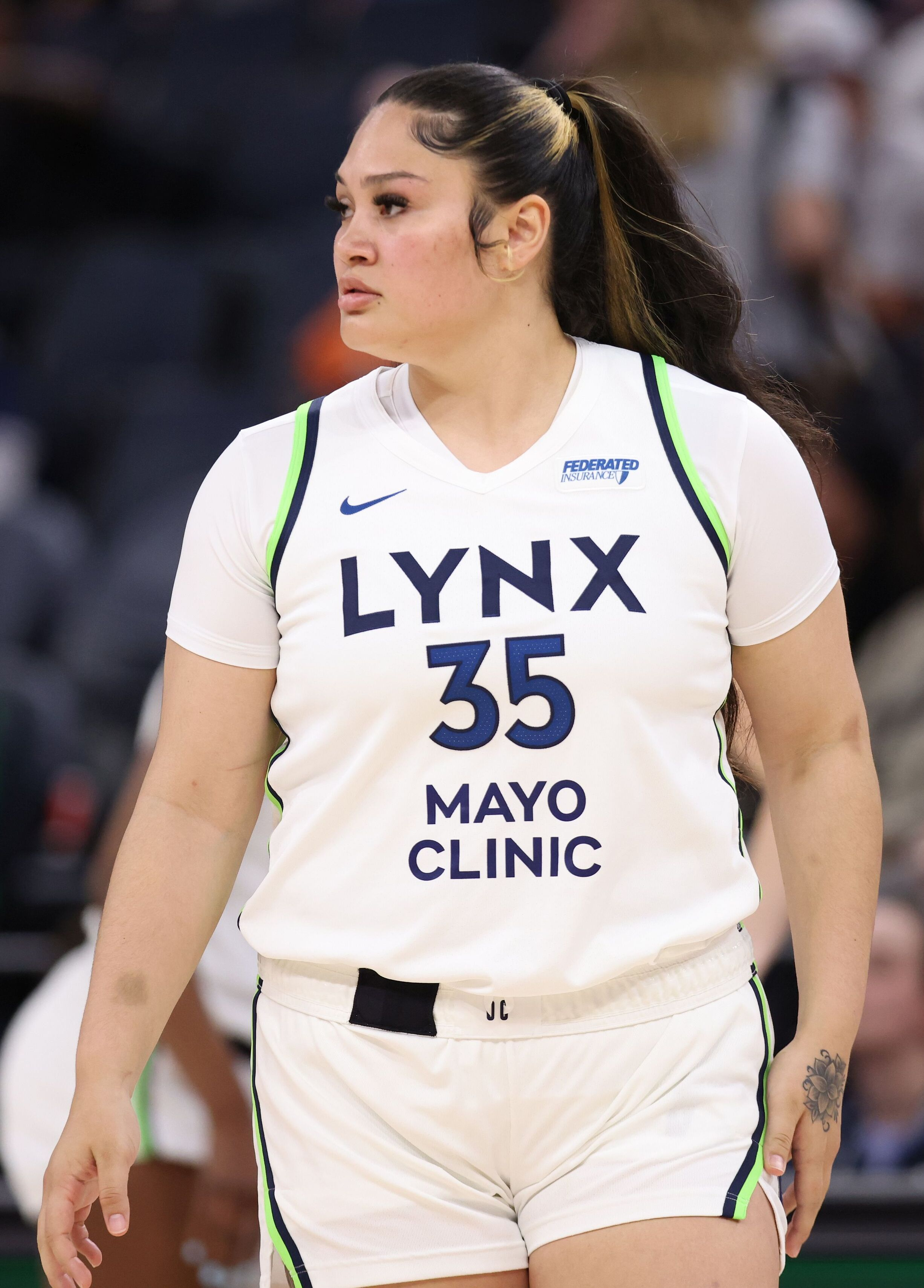
- Pili with the Minnesota Lynx in 2024

Free agent
- Position: Small forward
- League: WNBA

Personal information
- Born: June 8, 2001 (age 25) Anchorage, Alaska, U.S.
- Listed height: 5 ft 11 in (1.80 m)
- Listed weight: 235 lb (107 kg)

Career information
- High school: Dimond (Anchorage, Alaska)
- College: USC (2019–2022); Utah (2022–2024)
- WNBA draft: 2024: 1st round, 8th overall pick
- Drafted by: Minnesota Lynx
- Playing career: 2024–present

Career history
- 2024–2025: Minnesota Lynx
- 2025–2026: Los Angeles Sparks
- 2025–2026: Geelong Venom

Career highlights
- WNBA Commissioner's Cup winner (2024); Third-team All-American – AP (2024); Second-team All-American – AP, USBWA (2023); WBCA Coaches' All-American (2023); Pac-12 Player of the Year (2023); 3× All Pac-12 Team (2020, 2023, 2024); Pac-12 Freshman of the Year (2020); Pac-12 All-Freshman Team (2020)
- Stats at Basketball Reference

Alissa Katelina Pili (born June 8, 2001) is an American professional basketball player who is currently a free agent. She has played in the Women's National Basketball Association (WNBA) for the Minnesota Lynx and Los Angeles Sparks, and Geelong Venom of the Women's National Basketball League (WNBL). She played college basketball for the Utah Utes and USC Trojans.

== Early life ==
Pili was born in Anchorage, Alaska, to Heather and Billy Pili and is of Samoan and Inupiaq descent. She is a shareholder of Ukpeaġvik Iñupiat Corporation.

She played football as a lineman from third to eighth grade as the only girl in her league and started playing organized basketball at age eight.

Pili attended Dimond High School in Anchorage. As a freshman, Pili helped her team to a runner-up finish at the Class 4A state tournament. She led Dimond to two state championships, set the Class 4A all-time scoring record and was a three-time Alaska Gatorade Player of the Year. Pili won 13 state titles across all sports at Dimond, including four in volleyball, four in shot put, two in discus and one in wrestling. In her final two years of high school, she was named MaxPreps Female High School Athlete of the Year for her success in multiple sports, joining Missy Franklin as the only two-time recipients of the award. Rated a five-star recruit by ESPN, she committed to playing college basketball for USC.

== College career ==
=== USC Trojans ===
Pili entered her freshman season at USC as the team's starting forward. On February 23, 2020, she recorded a career-high 32 points and 12 rebounds in a 66–60 win over Washington State. As a freshman, Pili averaged 16.3 points and eight rebounds per game, and was named Pac-12 Freshman of the Year while making the All-Pac-12 Team. She missed the first 10 games of her sophomore season with an ankle injury. Pili averaged 11 points and 3.8 rebounds per game as a sophomore, earning All-Pac-12 honorable mention. In her junior season, she averaged 7.8 points and 4.5 rebounds per game, before entering the transfer portal.

=== Utah Utes ===
For her fourth year of college eligibility, Pili transferred to Utah for the 2023-24 season. Pili was named Pac-12 Player of the Year and earned All-Pac-12 honors after leading her team to a share of the conference regular season title. She was a second-team All-American selection by the Associated Press and the United States Basketball Writers Association, and made the Women's Basketball Coaches Association Coaches' All-America team. In her first season at Utah, she averaged 20.7 points, 5.6 rebounds and 2.3 assists per game. Utah received an at-large bid to the 2024 NCAA tournament and reached the second round. South Carolina coach Dawn Staley said of Pili's 37-point game, "We can't stop her," after the Gamecocks beat the Utes in their December 10, 2023, Hall of Fame showcase game.

== Professional career ==
=== WNBA ===
==== Minnesota Lynx (2024–2025) ====
Pili was selected as the eighth pick of the 2024 WNBA draft by the Minnesota Lynx. The Lynx welcomed Pili to the team with an event introducing her to local members of Indigenous and Polynesian communities, including the Minnesota Lt. Governor Peggy Flanagan and former Vikings player Esera Tuaolo.

In the 2024 preseason, Pili scored 10 points with 2 assists and 3 rebounds in the Lynx game on May 8, 2024, against the Washington Mystics. Pili made her WNBA debut in the Lynx's game against the Seattle Storm at Climate Pledge Arena on May 14. She played 10 minutes and had one rebound. In her second WNBA game, also against the Storm, on May 17, at Target Center, she scored her first points in the league, playing nine minutes and bringing in five points and two rebounds. Pili became the 10th WNBA rookie to score "20+pts while shooting perfect from deep with four or more 3’s" on May 31, against the Phoenix Mercury. In playing just over 15 minutes of the game off the bench, Pili put up 20 points, four rebounds, and two assists. She is also only the 4th WNBA rookie to score "20+ PTS and 4+ 3PM shooting 75+% from the field and perfect from three" and the only one of those four to do so coming off the bench.

On July 12, 2025, Pili was waived by the Lynx.

==== Los Angeles Sparks (2025, 2026) ====
On August 3, 2025, Pili signed with the Los Angeles Sparks on a seven-day contract.

On July 5, 2026, Pili signed a player development contract with the Sparks.

=== WNBL ===
On September 2, 2025, Pili signed with the Geelong Venom of the Women's National Basketball League (WNBL) in Australia for the 2025–26 season.

=== Athletes Unlimited ===
Pili signed to play the 2025 season with Athletes Unlimited. At the end of each season, Athletes Unlimited makes a grant equal to 100% of the athlete’s end-of-season win bonus to the non-profit of the athlete’s choice. Pili has chosen to play on behalf of the Arctic Education Foundation (AEF).

== Career statistics ==
Legend
GP	Games played	GS	Games started	MPG	Minutes per game	FG%	Field goal percentage	3P%	3-point field goal percentage
FT%	Free throw percentage	RPG	Rebounds per game	APG	Assists per game	SPG	Steals per game	BPG	Blocks per game
TO	Turnovers per game	PPG	Points per game	**Bold**	Career high	°	League leader	‡	WNBA record

=== WNBA ===
==== Regular season ====
Stats current through end of 2025 season

WNBA regular season statistics
Year	Team	GP	GS	MPG	FG%	3P%	FT%	RPG	APG	SPG	BPG	TO	PPG
2024	Minnesota	**22**	0	**6.3**	.422	.333	.545	**1.2**	**0.2**	**0.2**	0.1	0.9	2.4
2025	Minnesota	14	0	5.9	.455	**.364**	.750	**1.2**	**0.2**	0.1	0.0	0.5	1.9
2025	Los Angeles	5	0	3.4	**.500**	.000	**.909**	0.4	0.0	0.0	**0.2**	**0.2**	**3.2**
**Career**	2 years, 2 teams	41	0	5.8	.438	.333	.731	1.1	0.2	0.2	0.1	0.7	2.3

==== Playoffs ====
WNBA playoff statistics
Year	Team	GP	GS	MPG	FG%	3P%	FT%	RPG	APG	SPG	BPG	TO	PPG
2024	Minnesota	3	0	0.3	—	—	—	0.0	0.0	0.0	0.0	0.3	0.0
**Career**	1 year, 1 team	3	0	0.3	—	—	—	0.0	0.0	0.0	0.0	0.3	0.0

=== College ===
NCAA statistics
Year	Team	GP	GS	MPG	FG%	3P%	FT%	RPG	APG	SPG	BPG	TO	PPG
2019–20	USC	31	30	**30.6**	51.1	23.4	79.6	8.0	1.3	1.0	**0.9**	2.1	16.3
2020–21	USC	13	10	21.8	41.5	30.0	81.3	3.8	1.0	**1.1**	0.5	**1.4**	11.0
2021–22	USC	19	18	19.3	33.1	22.4	**82.2**	4.5	0.8	0.8	0.3	1.5	7.8
2022–23	Utah	31	30	26.7	**59.0**	**42.6**	79.7	5.6	2.3	1.0	0.7	2.3	20.7
2023–24	Utah	**34**	**34**	28.6	55.0	40.4	82.0	**6.6**	**2.4**	0.9	0.8	2.0	**21.4**
**Career**		128	122	26.5	51.9	34.4	80.7	6.1	1.7	1.0	0.7	2.0	16.9

== Business interests ==
On June 7, 2024, Nike announced that Pili signed an endorsement deal with the company for its N7 collection that has an Indigenous focus. Proceeds from items in the collection benefit the N7 Fund "to provide sport and physical activity programming to kids in Native American and Aboriginal communities."

== Personal life ==
In addition to her athletic success, Pili's Samoan and Indigenous heritage has made her a role model for others. Since college, she has attracted people with Samoan and Indigenous backgrounds to her games. Her mother, Heather Pili, said, "It gives a lot of hope to all of the natives in America. It’s amazing to see. It’s hard to describe being in that environment and seeing the crowds that she’s drawing. It’s pretty emotional.” For the WNBA draft, Pili worked with designer Jason Vu on a dress that showcased her Samoan culture. The dress used Samoan designs on the skirt, which had a slit to highlight the tribal tattoos on her right leg. The dress also was one shouldered to also highlight the tribal tattoos on her left shoulder. During the draft, Pili was quoted as saying, "A lot of Indigenous and Polynesian girls don’t get to see that role model and I’m just so blessed to be in the position to be that for them...I’m representing them with pride. I had to include the tribal in my dress." More than 100 people of Samoan heritage attended Pili's first home game playing for the Minnesota Lynx to show their support for her.

Her older brother, Brandon, played football for USC as a defensive lineman, and currently plays for the Seattle Seahawks of the National Football League.
