= Elaine Elliott =

American basketball player and coach

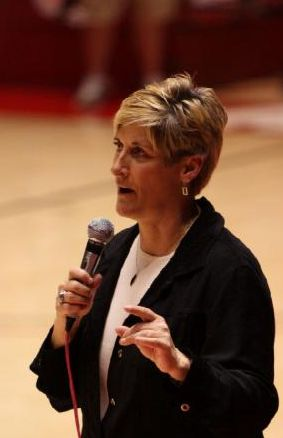
- Elliott in 2010

Playing career
- 1973–1977: Boise State

Coaching career (HC unless noted)
- 1977–1979: Boise HS (ID)
- 1979–1983: Utah (assistant)
- 1983–2010: Utah
- 2011–2014: Westminster (assistant)
- 2016–2017: Cal State Fullerton (assistant)

Head coaching record
- Overall: 582–234 (.713)
- Tournaments: 8–12 (NCAA D-I); 1–3 (WNIT); 0–1 (NWIT)

Accomplishments and honors

Championships
- WAC regular season (1996–1999); WAC tournament (1991, 1995); Mountain West regular season (2000, 2001, 2003–2005, 2008, 2009); Mountain West tournament (2000, 2006, 2009)

Awards
- HCAC Coach of the Year (1986, 1989); WAC Mountain Division Coach of the Year (1997, 1998, 1999); Mountain West Coach of the Year (2000, 2001, 2003, 2008); WBCA District Coach of the Year Award (1998, 2000, 2001, 2008, 2009); Wooden National Coach of the Year (2001)

Elaine Elliott is an American former basketball coach for the Utah Utes women's basketball team. She is the winningest basketball coach in school history, with a career record of 582–234 (.713). At the time of her retirement, she had led the Utes to 15 appearances in NCAA Women's Division I Basketball Championship, including an Elite Eight appearance in 2006. Elliott formally retired as head coach on March 23, 2011.

== Early life ==
Elliott was born and raised outside of Tacoma, Washington. Her father Will introduced her to the game of basketball as he was a former collegiate player. However, he chose not to pursue basketball after college and became a music teacher at Boise State University. While she played organized sports in Washington, she was unable to continue after her family moved to Boise, Idaho, in 1968, because her junior high school had no girls' sports. While enrolled at Capital High School, Elliott played competitive volleyball, basketball, and tennis. She competed against both men and women in tennis tournaments and won two state singles titles as a junior and senior.

== College career ==
After graduating from Capital High School, Elliott played collegiate basketball, field hockey, volleyball, and softball at Boise State University (BSU). As Title IX had not been fully implemented, none of her teams had matching uniforms or a team bus for travel. By the conclusion of her collegiate career Elliott set the single game, single season, and career assist record for women's basketball and ranked third on BSU's all-time scoring list in women's field hockey.

== Coaching career ==
After completing her undergraduate degree, Elliott returned to Idaho and served as head coach of Boise High School's women's basketball team. As the team's head coach, she helped lead them to the 1978 Idaho A-1 girls' state championship and was named A-1 Coach of the Year. The following year, Boise High ranked second in the state and Elliott had maintained a two-year winning record of 42–6. She left Boise in 1979 to join the Utah Utes women's basketball team as an assistant coach under the tutelage of Fern Gardner. As an assistant coach for four years, Elliott helped lead the Utes to an 85-35 record. In 1983, Elliott became the first woman inducted into Boise State's Athletic Hall of Fame for her contributions to women's basketball and field hockey. She was also promoted to head coach in March 1983 after Gardner retired.

On January 11, 2007, Elliott led the Utes to an upset over the Colorado State Rams to become the 25th coach with 500 career NCAA wins.

=== Later career and retirement ===
During a year-long leave of absence to consider retirement, former Assistant Coach Anthony Levrets took over as head coach.

Starting with the 2011–12 season, Elaine Elliott was an assistant coach at Salt Lake City's Westminster College.

Elliott also spent the 2016–17 season as assistant coach at California State University, Fullerton.

== Personal life ==
Elliott and her partner Lisa Church participated in a documentary film about four women with metastatic breast cancer, but Church died before the film was released.
