= Gavin Petersen =

American college basketball coach

Current position
- Title: Head coach
- Team: Utah Utes
- Conference: Big 12
- Record: 38–21 (.644)

Biographical details
- Education: Hawaiʻi Pacific (1999); Hawaiʻi (2009)

Coaching career (HC unless noted)
- 2002–2004: Hawaii (assistant)
- 2004–2006: Idaho State (assistant)
- 2006–2008: Idaho State (associate HC)
- 2008–2011: Idaho (associate HC)
- 2011–2012: Hawaii (assistant)
- 2012–2013: Hawaii (associate HC)
- 2013–2015: Pacific (assistant)
- 2015–2018: Utah (assistant)
- 2018–2024: Utah (associate HC)
- 2024–present: Utah

Head coaching record
- Overall: 38–21 (.644)

Gavin Petersen is an American basketball coach who is the current head coach of the Utah Utes women's basketball team.

== Early life and education ==
A native of Honolulu, Hawaii, Petersen graduated from University High School, where he played basketball as a point guard and off guard. He also played football as a running back and defensive back for Pac-5.

== Coaching career ==
In 2011, Petersen returned to the University of Hawaiʻi as assistant coach of the women's basketball team under Dana Takahara-Dias.

On November 22, 2024, Petersen was named as the new head coach of the University of Utah women's basketball team. The change was made four games into the 2024–25 season, after Lynne Roberts was hired as the head coach of the Los Angeles Sparks in the WNBA.

== Head coaching record ==
Record table
Season	Team	Overall	Conference	Standing	Postseason
Utah Utes (Big 12) (2024–present)
2024–25	Utah	19–8	13–5	T–4th	NCAA First Round
2025–26	Utah	19–13	10–8	T–7th	WBIT First Round
Utah:		38–21 (.644)	23–13 (.639)		
Total:		38–21 (.644)			
National champion Postseason invitational champion Conference regular season champion Conference regular season and conference tournament champion Division regular season champion Division regular season and conference tournament champion Conference tournament champion
