= Lynne Roberts (basketball) =

American basketball player and coach (born 1975)

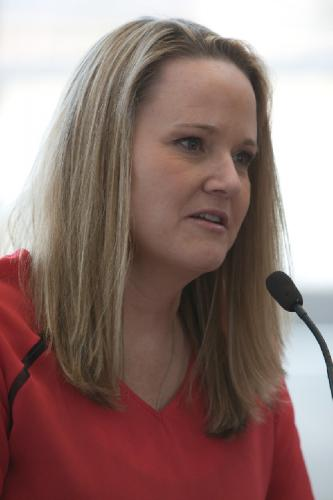
- Roberts in 2019

Personal information
- Born: August 28, 1975 (age 51) Redding, California, U.S.

Career information
- College: Seattle Pacific (1993–1997)
- Position: Forward
- Coaching career: 1997–present

Career history

Coaching
- 1997–2002: Seattle Pacific (asst.)
- 2002–2006: Chico State
- 2006–2015: Pacific
- 2015–2024: Utah
- 2025–2026: Los Angeles Sparks

Career highlights
- 3× CCAA regular season (2004–2006); CCAA tournament (2006); Big West regular season (2013); Pac-12 regular season (2023); Big West Coach of the Year (2013); Pac-12 Coach of the Year (2023)

Lynne Renee Roberts (born August 28, 1975) is an American professional basketball coach who most recently served as the head coach for the Los Angeles Sparks of the Women's National Basketball Association (WNBA). She previously served as head coach at Chico State, Pacific, and Utah.

== Early life and education ==
Roberts was born and raised in Redding, California. She attended Enterprise High School where she earned 12 varsity letters and was awarded the 1993 Northern Section Player of the Year.

Roberts attended Seattle Pacific University, where she played for the Falcons. During her time with the Falcons (1993–1997), Roberts set a school record for 3-pointers made in one season at 82 and for three-point percentage in a game when she made 7 of 8 against Willamette. Roberts regards her most memorable moment at college when she made the game winning 3-pointers to defeat Division I's UC Davis Aggies. Roberts graduated in 1997 with a bachelor's degree in history.

== Coaching career ==
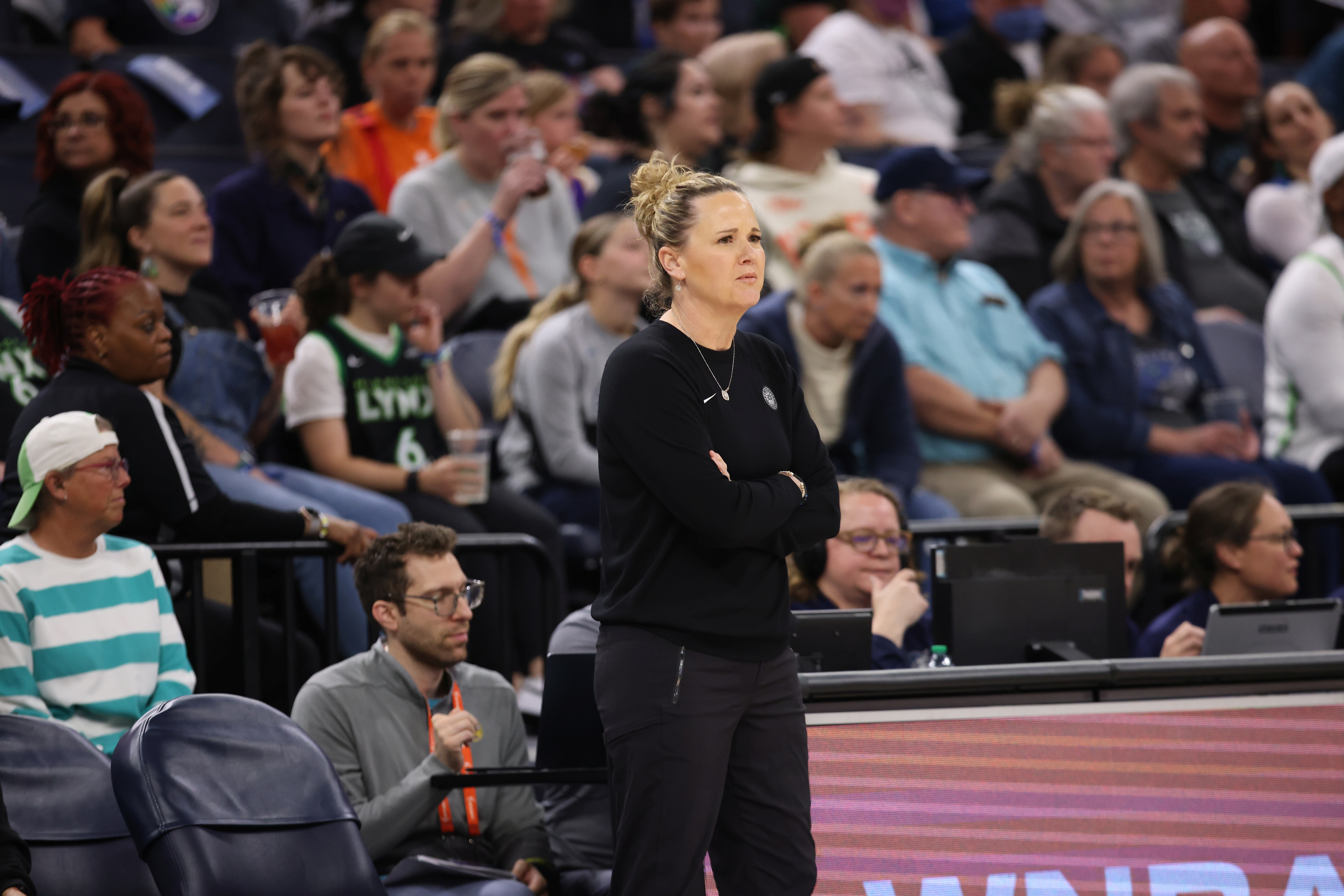
Roberts coaching the Los Angeles Sparks in 2025

After graduating from Seattle Pacific, Roberts remained to pursue a master's degree. While pursuing her master's degree, Roberts served as a student assistant for the Falcons. Over five seasons Roberts helped lead the Falcons to a 113–31 record and five straight NCAA Division 2 appearances. Roberts graduated with a master's degree in athletic administration in 2000.

In 2002 Roberts was hired as the head coach for Chico State, where she coached from 2002 to 2006 and amassed an 86–31 record. The Wildcats set school records for wins in both 2005 and 2006 while finishing first place in their conference. The 2005 title was the first CCAA title in Chico State history. That same season the Wildcats advanced to the NCAA Tournament West region Championship, and in 2006 the Wildcats would make it to the D2 Final Four.

In 2006 Roberts was hired as the head coach for the University of the Pacific. After a slow first few seasons, Roberts helped the Tigers post a record 27 wins in 2013. She won the Big West Conference coach of the year, and her team came to be known as the "Cardiac Kids." The Tigers made a school record 3 straight post-season appearances under Roberts. Roberts subsequently had her contract extended through 2017.

In March 2015, Roberts was selected as one of three WCC coaches to be named co-coach of the year. The other two were Saint Mary's Gaels coach Paul Thomas and Gonzaga Bulldogs coach Lisa Fortier.

On April 20, 2015, it was announced that the University of Utah hired Roberts as their next head women's basketball coach. In her first season Roberts led Utah to an 18–15 record, Utah's first winning season since 2012–13.

On November 19, 2024, Roberts was announced as the new head coach of the Los Angeles Sparks.

Roberts was dismissed as the head coach of the Sparks on September 25, 2026.

== Head coaching record ==
=== College ===
Record table
Season	Team	Overall	Conference	Standing	Postseason
Chico State Wildcats (California Collegiate Athletic Association) (2002–2006)
2002–03	Chico State	17–10	15–7	2nd	NCAA D-II First Round
2003–04	Chico State	17–11	13–9	1st	NCAA D-II First Round
2004–05	Chico State	24–6	16–4	1st	NCAA D-II Sweet 16
2005–06	Chico State	28–4	18–2	1st	NCAA D-II Final Four
Cal State Chico:		86–31 (.735)	62–22 (.738)		
Pacific Tigers (Big West Conference) (2006–2013)
2006–07	Pacific	8–22	2–12	8th	
2007–08	Pacific	14–16	9–7	4th	
2008–09	Pacific	14–16	8–8	4th	
2009–10	Pacific	6–23	4–12	8th	
2010–11	Pacific	9–22	5–11	T–7th	
2011–12	Pacific	18-14	9-7	T–3rd	WNIT Second Round
2012–13	Pacific	27–8	14–4	1st	WNIT Third Round
Pacific:		96–121 (.442)	51–61 (.455)		
Pacific Tigers (West Coast Conference) (2013–2015)
2013–14	Pacific	18–13	12–6	3rd	WNIT First Round
2014–15	Pacific	21–10	13–5	T–3rd	WNIT First Round
Pacific:		39–23 (.629)	25–11 (.694)		
Utah Utes (Pac-12 Conference) (2015–2024)
2015–16	Utah	18–15	8–10	7th	WNIT Third Round
2016–17	Utah	16–15	5–13	T–9th	WNIT First Round
2017–18	Utah	18–14	8–10	8th	WNIT Second Round
2018–19	Utah	20–10	9–9	T–6th	
2019–20	Utah	14–17	6–12	8th	
2020–21	Utah	5–16	4–15	10th	
2021–22	Utah	21–12	8–7	6th	NCAA Second Round
2022–23	Utah	27–5	15–3	T–1st	NCAA Sweet Sixteen
2023–24	Utah	23–11	11–7	T–5th	NCAA Second Round
Utah Utes (Big 12 Conference) (2024)
2024–25	Utah	3–1	0–0		
Utah:		165–116 (.587)	74–86 (.463)		
Total:		386–291 (.570)			
National champion Postseason invitational champion Conference regular season champion Conference regular season and conference tournament champion Division regular season champion Division regular season and conference tournament champion Conference tournament champion

=== WNBA ===
Legend
Regular season	G	Games coached	W	Games won	L	Games lost	W–L %	Win–loss %
Playoffs	PG	Playoff games	PW	Playoff wins	PL	Playoff losses	PW–L %	Playoff win–loss %

Team	Year	G	W	L	W–L%	Finish	PG	PW	PL	PW–L%	Result
Los Angeles	2025	44	21	23	.477	6th in West	0	0	0	–	Missed Playoffs
Los Angeles	2026	44	16	28	.364	6th in West	0	0	0	–	Missed Playoffs
Career		88	37	51	.420		0	0	0	–	
