= Utah Utes women's basketball =

American college basketball team

2026–27 Utah Utes women's basketball team
- University: University of Utah
- Head coach: Gavin Petersen (3rd season)
- Location: Salt Lake City, Utah
- Arena: Jon M. Huntsman Center (capacity: 15,000)
- Conference: Big 12
- Nickname: Utes
- Colors: Red and white

NCAA Division I tournament Elite Eight
- 2006
Other NCAA Division I tournament results
Sweet Sixteen	2001, 2006, 2023
Appearances	1983, 1986, 1989, 1990, 1991, 1995, 1996, 1997, 1998, 2000, 2001, 2003, 2005, 2006, 2008, 2009, 2011, 2022, 2023, 2024, 2025

AIAW tournament quarterfinals
- 1977
Other AIAW tournament results
Appearances	1976, 1977, 1978

Conference tournament champions
- 1989, 1990, 1991, 1995, 2000, 2006, 2009, 2011

Conference regular-season champions
- 1975, 1976, 1977, 1979, 1980, 1981, 1982, 1983, 1996, 2000, 2001, 2003, 2004, 2005, 2008, 2009, 2023

Uniforms
Home	Away

The Utah Utes women's basketball is the official team that is representing the University of Utah in women's basketball. The school competed in the Pac-12 Conference in Division I of the National Collegiate Athletic Association (NCAA) from 2010–11 through 2023–24; the Utes currently compete in the Big 12 Conference with that during the beginning in 2024–25 season.

== Season-by-season record ==
The Utes have an 864–400 record as of the 2015–16 season, with 17 appearances in the NCAA Tournament (1983, 1986, 1989, 1990, 1991, 1995, 1996, 1997, 1998, 2000, 2001, 2003, 2005, 2006, 2008, 2009, 2011). They have played in five conferences, playing in the Intermountain Athletic Conference (83–11 all-time record, 1974–82), the High Country Athletic Conference (67–13 all-time record, 1982–89), the Western Athletic Conference (99–27 all-time record, 1990–99), the Mountain West Conference (137–43 all-time record, 1999–2011), and the Pac-12 Conference (31–59 record, since 2011) since starting play in 1974. They have also been champions of the regular season in 1996, 2000, 2001, 2003, 2004, 2005, 2008, 2009 and 2023, while appearing in the Women's NIT in 1979, 1984, 1999, 2007, 2010, 2012, 2016. They appeared in the predecessor to the NCAA Tournament (the AIAW) in 1976 and 1977.

Season	Record	Conference record	Coach	Postseason finish
1974–75	12–2	10–1	John Hull	AIAW Regional
1975–76	19–5	12–1	Fern Gardner	AIAW first round
1976–77	26–3	13–0	Fern Gardner	AIAW Top Eight
1977–78	21–9	12–1	Fern Gardner	AIAW first round
1978–79	23–10	11–2	Fern Gardner	AIAW Regional/NWIT
1979–80	21–8	9–2	Fern Gardner	AIAW Regional
1980–81	24–9	9–1	Fern Gardner	AIAW Regional
1981–82	18–11	7–3	Fern Gardner	None
1982–83	22–7	11–1	Fern Gardner	NCAA First Round
1983–84	19–12	9–3	Elaine Elliott	NWIT
1984–85	16–12	8–4	Elaine Elliott	None
1985–86	21–8	11–1	Elaine Elliott	NCAA First Round
1986–87	20–7	10–2	Elaine Elliott	None
1987–88	19–9	9–1	Elaine Elliott	None
1988–89	24–6	9–1	Elaine Elliott	NCAA First Round
1989–90	20–10	6–4	Elaine Elliott	NCAA First Round
1990–91	20–10	9–3	Elaine Elliott	NCAA First Round
1991–92	22–8	10–4	Elaine Elliott	None
1992–93	19–10	9–5	Elaine Elliott	None
1993–94	12–14	9–5	Elaine Elliott	None
1994–95	23–7	12–2	Elaine Elliott	NCAA First Round
1995–96	21–8	12–2	Elaine Elliott	NCAA First Round
1996–97	25–6	15–1	Elaine Elliott	NCAA Second Round
1997–98	21–6	11–3	Elaine Elliott	NCAA First Round
1998–99	21–7	12–2	Elaine Elliott	WNIT First Round
1999-00	23–8	11–3	Elaine Elliott	NCAA First Round
2000–01	28–4	14–0	Elaine Elliott	NCAA Sweet Sixteen
2001–02	15–12	8–6	Elaine Elliott	None
2002–03	24–7	12–2	Elaine Elliott	NCAA Second Round
2003–04	24–7	12–2	Elaine Elliott	None
2004–05	26–8	12–2	Elaine Elliott	NCAA Second Round
2005–06	27–7	12–4	Elaine Elliott	NCAA Elite Eight
2006–07	19–14	10–6	Elaine Elliott	WNIT First Round
2007–08	27–5	16–0	Elaine Elliott	NCAA First Round
2008–09	23–10	13–3	Elaine Elliott	NCAA Second Round
2009–10	23–12	10–6	Elaine Elliott	WNIT Second Round
2010–11	18–17	7–9	Anthony Levrets	NCAA First Round
2011–12	16–16	8–10	Anthony Levrets	WNIT Second Round
2012–13	23–14	8–10	Anthony Levrets	WNIT Final
2013–14	12–19	4–14	Anthony Levrets	None
2014–15	9–21	3–15	Anthony Levrets	None
2015–16	18–15	8–10	Lynne Roberts	WNIT Third Round
2016–17	15–15	5–13	Lynne Roberts	WNIT First Round
2017–18	18–14	8–10	Lynne Roberts	WNIT Second Round
2018–19	20–10	9–9	Lynne Roberts	None
2019–20	14–17	6–12	Lynne Roberts	None
2020–21	5–16	4–15	Lynne Roberts	None
2021–22	21–12	8–7	Lynne Roberts	NCAA Second Round
2022–23	27–5	15−3	Lynne Roberts	NCAA Sweet Sixteen
2023–24	22−11	11−7	Lynne Roberts	NCAA Second Round

== NCAA tournament results ==
The Utes have appeared in 21 NCAA tournaments, with a record of 13–21.

Year	Seed	Round	Opponent	Result
1983	#5	First Round	#4 Arizona State	L 64−78
1986	#9	First Round	#8 Montana	L 46−58
1989	#11	First Round	#6 UNLV	L 53−67
1990	#12	First Round	#5 Ole Miss	L 51−74
1991	#12	First Round	#5 Southern Cal	L 52−63
1995	#8	First Round	#9 SW Missouri State	L 47−49
1996	#8	First Round	#9 Southern Miss	L 66−74
1997	#5	First Round; Second Round	#12 Iowa State #4 Virginia	W 66−57; L 46−65
1998	#7	First Round	#10 Louisville	L 61−69
2000	#11	First Round	#6 Illinois	L 58−73
2001	#5	First Round; Second Round; Sweet Sixteen	#12 Fairfield #4 Iowa #1 Notre Dame	W 79−57; W 78−69; L 54−69
2003	#8	First Round; Second Round	#9 DePaul #1 Duke	W 73−64; L 54−65
2005	#10	First Round; Second Round	#7 Iowa State #2 Stanford	W 73−61; L 62−88
2006	#5	First Round; Second Round; Sweet Sixteen; Elite Eight	#12 Middle Tenn #4 Arizona State #8 Boston College #2 Maryland	W 76−71; W 86−65; W 57−54; L 65−75 (OT)
2008	#8	First Round	#9 Purdue	L 59−66
2009	#9	First Round; Second Round	#8 Villanova #1 Maryland	W 60−30; L 56−71
2011	#15	First Round	#2 Notre Dame	L 54−67
2022	#7	First Round; Second Round	#10 Arkansas #2 Texas	W 92−69; L 56−78
2023	#2	First Round; Second Round; Sweet Sixteen	#15 Gardner-Webb #10 Princeton #3 LSU	W 103−77; W 63−56; L 63−66
2024	#5	First Round; Second Round	#12 South Dakota State #4 Gonzaga	W 68−54; L 66−77
2025	#8	First Round	#9 Indiana	L 68–76

== International ==
- Paige Crozon Canada: 2017 Summer Universiade
