= Marshall School =

Private school in Minnesota, US

Coordinates: 46°47′52″N 92°06′26″W

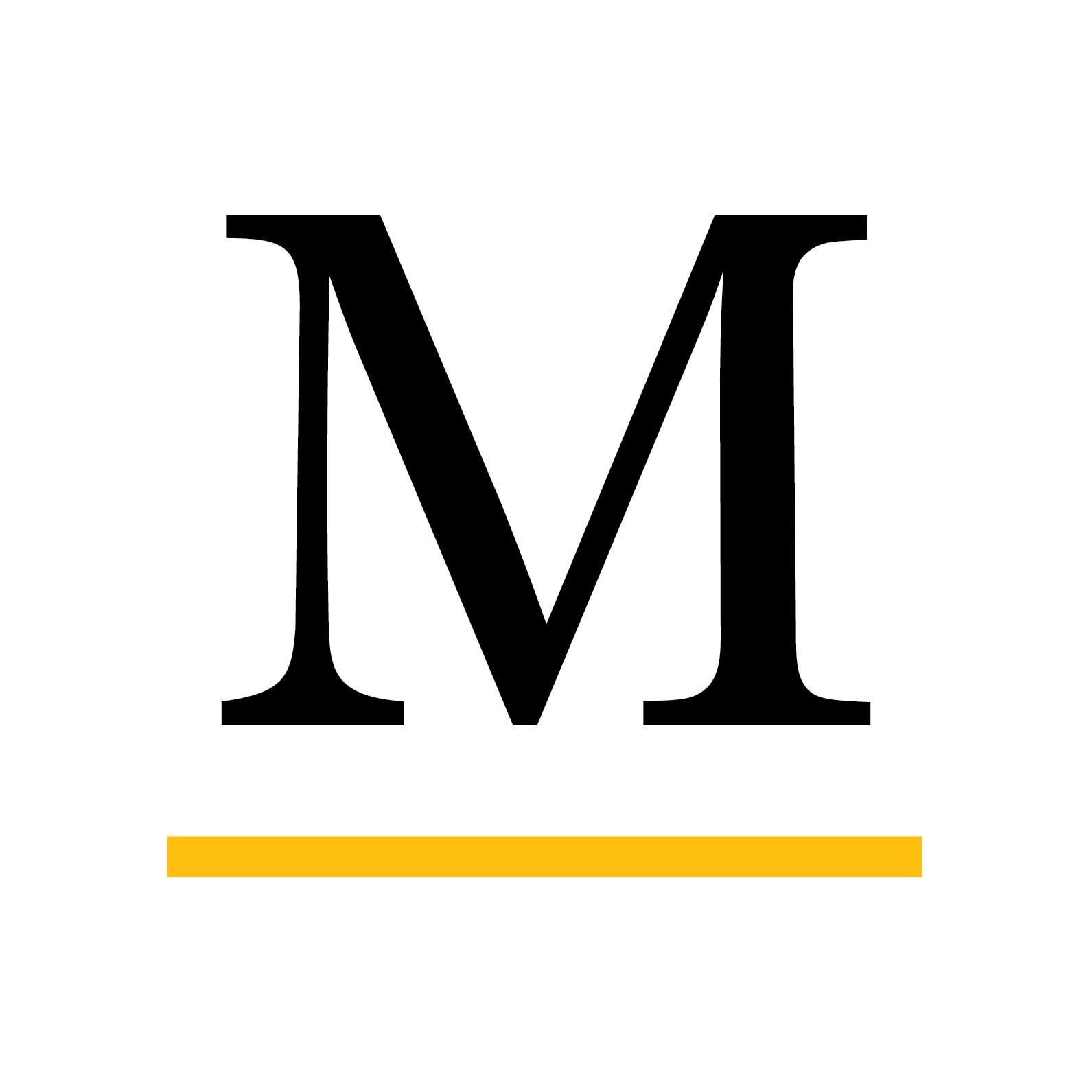

Location
- 1215 Rice Lake Road; Duluth, Minnesota, (St. Louis County) 55811; United States

Information
- Type: Private, Independent
- Established: 1904
- Head of school: Anthony Pisapia
- Faculty: 44
- Grades: Kindergarten - 12th grade
- Enrollment: 435 (2022-2023)
  - Grade 12: 75
- Average class size: 16
- Student to teacher ratio: 12:1
- Campus type: 40 acres (16 ha)
- Colors: Black & gold
- Fight song: Notre Dame Victory March
- Athletics: Minnesota State High School League (MSHSL)
- Athletics conference: Lake Superior Conference
- Nickname: Hilltoppers
- Accreditation: ISACS Accredited
- Publication: The Hilltopper
- Newspaper: The Marshall Times
- Yearbook: The Beacon
- Alumni: 7,000
- Website: marshallschool.org

Marshall School is an independent, coeducational, day school in Duluth, Minnesota for students in kindergarten through 12th grade. Marshall School is sometimes referred to as Duluth Marshall at Minnesota State High School League athletic tournaments.

== History ==
=== Cathedral Senior High School ===
The building on Fourth Street and Second Avenue West that housed Duluth Cathedral until 1963. The building now houses the Damiano Center.

Founded in 1904 by the Catholic Diocese of Duluth, Duluth Cathedral was originally a high school for boys. In 1910, the diocese added girls, but it was not until 1942 that the school was fully coeducational. In 1963, the school moved to the newly constructed campus on Rice Lake Road, where it remains to this day.

=== Marshall School ===
Marshall School is the Twin Ports flagship independent school and has served the Duluth area for more than a century. Founded in 1904 as Cathedral Senior High School.

Now a member of the National Association of Independent Schools (NAIS) and the Independent Schools Association of the Central States (ISACS), Marshall serves students from kindergarten to 12th grade.

Originally located in downtown Duluth on the corner of 4th Street and 2nd Avenue, the school began as a Catholic high school. In the early 1960s, the school moved to its current location in Duluth on Rice Lake Road. It became an all-faith institution in the early 1970s, which led to a name change to Marshall School in 1987.

Marshall School expanded to include grades 7 and 8 in 1982-83. Recently, Marshall has added grades 4, 5, and 6 in the past two decades, and in the fall of 2022, opened the Forest School. The Forest School serves children ages four through fourth grade. Since 2006, Marshall has also had a robust international program with more than 200 students from nearly 44 countries.

== Campus ==
The campus is on a 40-acre (16 ha) hillside overlooking Lake Superior and downtown Duluth and includes academic and technology centers, athletic fields, cross-country ski trails, tennis courts, a hockey rink, and fine arts and performance areas. In 2016, on-campus housing was added for international students.

== Academics ==
=== Admissions ===
The admissions office does not select students solely on the basis of academic strength. A willingness to prioritize academics, the desire to be a "person of character", and a desire to be a part of the Marshall School community are essential qualities for a positive admission decision.

On average, 60% of students at Marshall receive need-based financial aid.

=== Upper school ===
The average class size is 18. Fine arts opportunities include concert choir, chamber choir, concert band, jazz band, concert orchestra strings ensemble, and drama program.

Nearly 70% of seniors sit for AP exams across 23 subjects, with nearly 75% scoring a 3 or higher. The 2015 ACT average score was 27.

Upon graduation from Marshall, 98% of students attend four-year colleges.

==== Community Service Learning Program ====
Students in grades nine through twelve are required to complete a minimum of ten hours of community service each year, with a total of forty hours required for graduation.

=== Middle school ===
Marshall School's middle school serves students in grades 5 through 8. Middle School students are able to take a range of diverse classes including music ensembles, daily foreign language courses, and daily physical education.

=== Forest School at Marshall ===
The Forest School at Marshall opened in the fall of 2022 and serves students age 4 through fourth grade. 50% of the school day will be spent outside learning on the campus grounds.

=== Faculty ===
Marshall School has a student-to-faculty ratio of 10:1. Of the 44 faculty members, 19 hold advanced degrees and 4 hold doctorates.

== Activities ==
=== Clubs ===
Upper school clubs	Upper school clubs	Middle school clubs		
Black Student Union	Jazz Band	Destination Imagination		
Ping Pong Club	Knowledge Bowl			
Chamber Singers	Knowledge Bowl	Lego Robotics Club		
Chess Club	Math League	Math League		
Cooking Club	Speech			
CyberPatriots	National Art Honor Society			
Destination Imagination	National Honor Society		Drama Club	Robotics
Environmental Advocacy Group	Rock Band Club			
Fellowship of Christian Students	Spectrum Club			
Gardening Club	Speech			
Topper Tour Guides				
Health & Wellness Club	Trapshooting			
Hilltopper Council	Yearbook			
Honor Council	Youth in Action			

== Athletics ==
Marshall School supports 19 athletic teams that compete in the Lake Superior Conference, Section 7A (except Boys Hockey, which competes at Section 7AA), and the Minnesota State High School League. More than 85% of Marshall students participate in at least one sport, often alongside other clubs and activities including cheering on fellow student-athletes at competitions throughout the year. Marshall teams compete at the varsity level in 19 different MSHSL sports. Most sports offer opportunities at junior high and JV levels.

=== Upper school athletics ===
Fall sports	Winter sports	Spring sports
Boys' hockey	Baseball	Softball
Boys' soccer	Girls' hockey	Golf
Girls' soccer	Girls' basketball	Boys' tennis
Volleyball	Boys' basketball	Track & field
Cross country running	Danceline	
Girls' tennis	Alpine skiing	
Football	Nordic skiing	

=== Middle school athletics ===
Fall sports	Winter sports	Spring sports
Boys' soccer	Boys' basketball	Baseball
Girls' soccer	Girls' basketball	Softball
Volleyball	Alpine skiing	Track & field
Cross country running	Nordic skiing	Boys' tennis
Girls' tennis	Danceline	Boys' golf
	Boys' hockey	Girls' golf
	Girls' hockey	

=== Boys' hockey ===
Brendan Flaherty, who graduated from Duluth Cathedral in 1982, coached the team for 22 seasons. Coach Flaherty was a three-time Section Coach of the Year, won four Conference Championships and eight Section Championships, and was a three-time State Championship finalist. He coached nine Division I players and nineteen Division III players, among them Jack Connolly, UMD, Hobey Baker recipient 2012. The Hilltoppers have appeared in seven state tournaments, and most recently finished fifth in the state tournament (2013).

In December 2014, Marshall School announced the team would be moving to Class AA, the larger of the two classes, beginning in the 2015–2016 season.

=== Girls' hockey ===
Marshall School's girls' hockey team had their inaugural season in 2014–2015, playing with just a junior varsity team. In January 2015, Marshall School announced the team would also have a varsity squad for the following 2015–2016 season.

=== Dance—Jazz division ===
With six Class A Jazz state championship titles, Marshall School Dance Team is the most winning team since jazz was added to the MSHSL in 1997. The dance team experienced a five-year win streak from 2006 to 2011 before winning again in 2015.

=== MSHSL state tournament appearances ===
State appearances
Season	Sport	Number of appearances	Year
Fall	Soccer, boys'	4	1998 (2nd), 2006, 2007 (1st) 2012 (3rd)
Winter	Hockey, boys'	12	1965 (1st), 1966 (1st), 1967 (1st), 1968 (1st), 1969 (1st), 2001, 2005 (3rd), 2006 (2nd), 2007 (2nd), 2008 (2nd), 2012, 2013
Winter	Basketball, boys'	1	2002
Winter	Basketball, girls'	2	2020, 2021
Dance team	10	2005 (3rd), 2006 (2nd), 2007 (1st), 2008 (1st), 2009 (1st), 2010 (1st), 2011 (1st), 2014 (2nd), 2015 (1st - Jazz), 2015 (4th)	
Spring	Golf, boys'	2	2003, 2004 (1st)
Spring	Tennis, boys'	2	2006, 2008
Spring	Golf, girls'	4	2004, 2005, 2006, 2007
Spring	Baseball	4	2017 (4th), 2018 (2nd), 2019 (1st), 2022 (5th)
Total		39	

== Notable alumni ==
- Maria Bamford — comedian
- Jack Connolly — member of University of Minnesota Duluth's 2010-2011 Division 1 men's college ice hockey championship team
- Tyler George — Olympic gold medalist in curling at the 2018 Winter Olympics
- Hank Harris — actor
- Anna Ringsred — Olympic speed skater
- Gianna Kneepkens — WNBA Women's Basketball
