= 2022–23 Big Ten Conference women's basketball season =

- League: NCAA Division I
- Sport: Basketball
- Teams: 14
- TV partner(s): Big Ten Network, ESPN, Fox, FS1

2022–23 NCAA Division I women's basketball season
- Season champions: Indiana
- Season MVP: Caitlin Clark, Iowa

Tournament
- Champions: Iowa
- Runners-up: Ohio State
- Finals MVP: Caitlin Clark, Iowa

Basketball seasons
- 2021–22 2023–24

2022–23 Big Ten women's basketball standings
	Conf.				Overall
Team	W		L	PCT	W		L	PCT
No. 2 Indiana	16	–	2	.889	28	–	4	.875
No. 3 Iowa †	15	–	3	.833	31	–	7	.816
No. 7 Maryland	15	–	3	.833	28	–	7	.800
No. 12 Ohio State	12	–	6	.667	28	–	8	.778
No. 18 Michigan	11	–	7	.611	23	–	10	.697
Illinois	11	–	7	.611	22	–	10	.688
Purdue	9	–	8	.529	19	–	11	.633
Nebraska	8	–	10	.444	18	–	15	.545
Michigan State	7	–	10	.412	16	–	14	.533
Wisconsin	6	–	12	.333	11	–	20	.355
Rutgers	5	–	13	.278	12	–	20	.375
Minnesota	4	–	14	.222	11	–	19	.367
Penn State	4	–	14	.222	14	–	17	.452
Northwestern	2	–	16	.111	9	–	21	.300
† 2023 Big Ten tournament winner As of April 2, 2023; Rankings from AP poll

The 2022–23 Big Ten women's basketball season began with practices in October 2022, followed by the start of the 2022–23 NCAA Division I women's basketball season in November 2022. The regular season ended in March 2022.

== Head coaches ==
=== Coaching changes prior to the season ===
==== Illinois ====
On March 21, 2022, Shauna Green was named the tenth head coach of Illinois.

==== Rutgers ====
On May 23, 2022, Coquese Washington was named the third full time head coach of Rutgers, following the retirement of longtime head coach C. Vivian Stringer.

=== Coaches ===
Team	Head coach	Previous job	Years at school	Overall record	Big Ten record	Big Ten titles	Big Ten Tournament titles	NCAA tournaments	NCAA Final Fours	NCAA Championships
Illinois	Shauna Green	Dayton	1	0–0	0–0	0	0	0	0	0
Indiana	Teri Moren	Indiana State	9	172–89	83–55	0	0	4	0	0
Iowa	Lisa Bluder	Drake	23	463–233	232–139	2	3	16	0	0
Maryland	Brenda Frese	Minnesota	21	535–139	122–17*	6	5	18	3	1
Michigan	Kim Barnes Arico	St. John's (Asst.)	11	218–109	98–68	0	0	5	0	0
Michigan State	Suzy Merchant	Eastern Michigan	16	311–173	152–102	2	0	10	0	0
Minnesota	Lindsay Whalen	Minnesota Lynx (Player)	5	60–57	28–44	0	0	0	0	0
Nebraska	Amy Williams	South Dakota	7	94–82	50–55	0	0	2	0	0
Northwestern	Joe McKeown	George Washington	15	241–198	102–136	0	0	2	0	0
Ohio State	Kevin McGuff	Washington	10	193–91	105–49	3	1	5	0	0
Penn State	Carolyn Kieger	Marquette	2	27–56	12–43	0	0	0	0	0
Purdue	Katie Gearlds	Marian	2	16–14	7–11	0	0	0	0	0
Rutgers	Coquese Washington	Notre Dame (Assoc.)	1	0–0	0–0	0	0	0	0	0
Wisconsin	Marisa Moseley	Boston University	2	8–21	5–13	0	0	0	0	0

Notes:

- All records, appearances, titles, etc. are from time with current school only.
- Year at school includes 2022–23 season.
- Overall and Big Ten records are from time at current school and are through the beginning of the season.
- Frese's ACC conference record excluded since Maryland began Big Ten Conference play in 2014–15.

== Regular season ==
The 2022–23 Big Ten Network television schedule was released on September 21, 2022.

=== Records against other conferences ===
2022–23 records against non-conference opponents, as of December 22, 2022:

Regular season

Power 7 conferences	Record
American	3–0
ACC	10–11
Big East	3–6
Big 12	6–4
Pac-12	2–2
SEC	6–4
Power 7 conferences total	30–27
Other NCAA Division 1 conferences	Record
America East	6–0
A-10	3–1
ASUN	3–0
Big Sky	0–0
Big South	1–0
Big West	0–0
CAA	3–2
C-USA	2–0
Horizon	9–1
Independent	1–0
Ivy League	5–1
MAAC	4–0
MAC	6–1
MEAC	4–0
MVC	12–2
Mountain West	4–0
NEC	2–0
OVC	3–0
Patriot League	1–0
SoCon	1–0
Southland	5–0
SWAC	4–0
Summit League	3–2
Sun Belt	2–0
WAC	1–0
WCC	0–0
Other Division I total	85–10
NCAA Division I total	115–37

Post season

Power 7 conferences	Record
American	0–0
ACC	0–0
Big East	0–0
Big 12	0–0
Pac-12	0–0
SEC	0–0
Power 7 conferences total	0–0
Other NCAA Division 1 conferences	Record
America East	0–0
A-10	0–0
ASUN	0–0
Big Sky	0–0
Big South	0–0
Big West	0–0
CAA	0–0
C-USA	0–0
Horizon	0–0
Ivy League	0–0
MAAC	0–0
MAC	0–0
MEAC	0–0
MVC	0–0
Mountain West	0–0
NEC	0–0
OVC	0–0
Patriot League	0–0
SoCon	0–0
Southland	0–0
SWAC	0–0
Summit League	0–0
Sun Belt	0–0
WAC	0–0
WCC	0–0
Other Division I total	0–0
NCAA Division I total	0–0

=== Record against ranked non-conference opponents ===
This is a list of games against ranked opponents only (rankings from the AP Poll):

Date	Visitor	Home	Site	Significance	Score	Conference record
Nov 7	Northwestern	No. 20 Oregon	Matthew Knight Arena ● Eugene, OR	—	L 57–100	0–1
Nov 8	No. 5 Tennessee	No. 14 Ohio State	Value City Arena ● Columbus, OH	—	W 87–75	1–1
Nov 11	No. 1 South Carolina	No. 17 Maryland	Xfinity Center ● College Park, MD	—	L 56–81	1–2
Nov 14	No. 12 Indiana	No. 11 Tennessee	Thompson–Boling Arena ● Knoxville, TN	—	W 79–67	2–2
Nov 15	No. 22 Nebraska	No. 20 Creighton	D. J. Sokol Arena ● Omaha, NE	—	L 51–77	2–3
Nov 16	No. 9 Notre Dame	Northwestern	Welsh–Ryan Arena ● Evanston, IL	—	L 58–92	2–4
Nov 19	No. 11 Tennessee	Rutgers †	Imperial Arena ● Paradise Island, Bahamas	Battle 4 Atlantis	L 54–94	2–5
Nov 20	No. 19 Maryland	No. 17 Baylor	Ferrell Center ● Waco, TX	—	W 73–68	3–5
Nov 21	No. 19 Texas	Rutgers †	Imperial Arena ● Paradise Island, Bahamas	Battle 4 Atlantis	L 44–82	3–6
Nov 24	Michigan State	No. 5 Iowa State †	Chiles Center ● Portland, OR	Phil Knight Invitational	L 49–80	3–7
Nov 27	Michigan State	No. 18 Oregon †	Veterans Memorial Coliseum ● Portland, OR	Phil Knight Invitational	L 78–86	3–8
Nov 27	No. 9 Iowa	No. 3 Connecticut †	Moda Center ● Portland, OR	Phil Knight Legacy	L 79–86	3–9
Nov 27	No. 22 Michigan	No. 21 Baylor †	Hertz Arena ● Estero, FL	Gulf Coast Showcase	W 84–75	4–9
Nov 30	No. 4 Ohio State	No. 18 Louisville	KFC Yum! Center ● Louisville, KY	ACC–Big Ten Women's Challenge	W 96–77	5–9
Dec 1	No. 6 North Carolina	No. 5 Indiana	Simon Skjodt Assembly Hall ● Bloomington, IN	ACC–Big Ten Women's Challenge	W 87–63	6–9
Dec 1	No. 20 Maryland	No. 7 Notre Dame	Joyce Center ● Notre Dame, IN	ACC–Big Ten Women's Challenge	W 74–72	7–9
Dec 1	Nebraska	No. 9 Virginia Tech	Cassell Coliseum ● Blacksburg, VA	ACC–Big Ten Women's Challenge	L 54–85	7–10
Dec 1	No. 12 NC State	No. 10 Iowa	Carver–Hawkeye Arena ● Iowa City, IA	ACC–Big Ten Women's Challenge	L 81–94	7–11
Dec 7	No. 10 Iowa State	No. 16 Iowa	Carver–Hawkeye Arena ● Iowa City, IA	Iowa Corn Cy-Hawk Series	W 70–57	8–11
Dec 11	No. 6 Connecticut	No. 20 Maryland	Xfinity Center ● College Park, MD	—	W 85–78	9–11
Dec 20	No. 6 North Carolina	No. 19 Michigan †	Spectrum Center ● Charlotte, NC	Jumpman Invitational	W 76–68	10–11
Dec 21	No. 16 Oregon	No. 3 Ohio State †	Pechanga Arena ● San Diego, CA	San Diego Invitational	W 84–67	11–11
Dec 21	No. 20 Kansas	Nebraska	Pinnacle Bank Arena ● Lincoln, NE	—	W 85–79 ^{(3OT)}	12–11

Team rankings are reflective of AP poll when the game was played, not current or final ranking

† denotes game was played on neutral site

=== Rankings ===
Legend
Increase in ranking
Decrease in ranking
Not ranked previous week
First Place votes shown in ()

		Pre	Wk 2	Wk 3	Wk 4	Wk 5	Wk 6	Wk 7	Wk 8	Wk 9	Wk 10	Wk 11	Wk 12	Wk 13	Wk 14	Wk 15	Wk 16	Wk 17	Wk 18	Wk 19	Final
Illinois	AP									RV	24	21	22	RV	RV	RV	25т	RV	NV		
Illinois	C								RV	RV	24	23	22	24	RV	RV	RV	NV			
Indiana	AP	11	12	6	5	4	4	4	4	6	6	6	6	4	2	2	2	2	3	2	
Indiana	C	11	9	5	4	3	3	3	3	7	6	6	6	5	3	2	2	2	2	2	
Iowa	AP	4	4	9	10	16	12	13	12	16	12	10	10т	6	5	7	6	7	2	3	
Iowa	C	6т	6	8	10	13	11	11	10	12	9	9	8	6	6	7	6	7	3	3	
Maryland	AP	17	19	14	20	20	15	15	16	13	9	11	10т	8	8	8	7	5	6	7	
Maryland	C	18	21	17	21	21	19	17	17	14	11	11	11	9	8	8	8	6	7	7	
Michigan	AP	25	23	22	17	14	19	19	14	14	17	14	13	18	12	12	12	17	18	18	
Michigan	C	23	23	23	20	16	21	21	19	19	20	16	17	19	14	13	17	18	18	18	
Michigan State	AP																				
Michigan State	C																				
Minnesota	AP																				
Minnesota	C																				
Nebraska	AP	22	22	RV	NV	RV	RV	RV	RV	RV	NV										
Nebraska	C	22	22	RV	RV	RV	RV	RV	RV	NV											
Northwestern	AP																				
Northwestern	C																				
Ohio State	AP	14	8	4	4	3	3	3	3	3	3	2	2	10	13	13	16	14	12	12	
Ohio State	C	15	10	6	5	4	4	4	4	3	3	2	5	10	12	14	13	14	13	12	
Penn State	AP																				
Penn State	C																				
Purdue	AP					RV	NV							RV	RV	NV					
Purdue	C													RV	NV	RV					
Rutgers	AP																				
Rutgers	C																				
Wisconsin	AP																				
Wisconsin	C																				

== Awards and honors ==
=== Players of the Week ===
Throughout the conference regular season, Big Ten Conference offices named two players (Player and Freshman) of the week each Monday.

Week	Player of the Week	School	Ref.	Freshman of the Week	School	Ref.
Nov. 14	Monika Czinano	Iowa		Mara Braun	Minnesota	
Nov. 21	Diamond Miller	Maryland		Mallory Heyer Serah Williams	Minnesota Wisconsin	
Nov. 28	Mackenzie Holmes	Indiana		Yarden Garzon	Indiana	
Dec. 5	Caitlin Clark	Iowa		Mara Braun (2)	Minnesota	
Dec. 12	Caitlin Clark (2)	Iowa		Cotie McMahon	Ohio State	
Dec. 19	Alexis Markowski	Nebraska		Cotie McMahon (2) Kaylene Smikle	Ohio State Rutgers	
Dec. 26	Genesis Bryant Leigha Brown	Illinois Michigan		Cotie McMahon (3)	Ohio State	
Jan. 2	Genesis Bryant (2) Mackenzie Holmes (2)	Illinois Indiana		Cotie McMahon (4)	Ohio State	
Jan. 9	Taylor Mikesell	Ohio State		Kaylene Smikle (2)	Rutgers	
Jan. 16	Caitlin Clark (3)	Iowa		Yarden Garzon (2)	Indiana	
Jan. 23	Shyanne Sellers	Maryland		Kaylene Smikle (3)	Rutgers	
Jan. 30	Mackenzie Holmes (3) Caitlin Clark (4)	Indiana Iowa		Yarden Garzon (3)	Indiana	
Feb. 6	Caitlin Clark (5)	Iowa		Serah Williams (2)	Wisconsin	
Feb. 13	Diamond Miller (2)	Maryland		Cotie McMahon (5)	Ohio State	
Feb. 20	Mackenzie Holmes (4)	Indiana		Cotie McMahon (6)	Ohio State	
Feb. 27	Caitlin Clark (6)	Iowa		Serah Williams (3)	Wisconsin	

School	PoW	FoW	Total
Iowa	7	—	7
Indiana	4	3	7
Ohio State	1	6	7
Maryland	3	—	3
Wisconsin	—	3	3
Rutgers	—	3	3
Minnesota	—	3	3
Illinois	2	—	2
Michigan	1	—	1
Nebraska	1	—	1

=== All-Big Ten awards and teams ===
On February 28, 2023, the Big Ten announced most of its conference awards.

Honor	Coaches	Media
Player of the Year	Caitlin Clark, Iowa	Caitlin Clark, Iowa
Coach of the Year	Teri Moren, Indiana	Teri Moren, Indiana
Freshman of the Year	Cotie McMahon, Ohio State	Cotie McMahon, Ohio State
Defensive Player of the Year	Mackenzie Holmes, Indiana	Mackenzie Holmes, Indiana
Sixth Player of the Year	Hannah Stuelke, Iowa	Hannah Stuelke, Iowa
All-Big Ten First Team	Grace Berger, Indiana	Grace Berger, Indiana
All-Big Ten First Team	Leigha Brown, Michigan	Leigha Brown, Michigan
All-Big Ten First Team	Caitlin Clark, Iowa	Caitlin Clark, Iowa
All-Big Ten First Team	Makira Cook, Illinois	Makira Cook, Illinois
All-Big Ten First Team	Monika Czinano, Iowa	Monika Czinano, Iowa
All-Big Ten First Team	Mackenzie Holmes, Indiana	Mackenzie Holmes, Indiana
All-Big Ten First Team	Emily Kiser, Michigan	Makenna Marisa, Penn State
All-Big Ten First Team	Taylor Mikesell, Ohio State	Taylor Mikesell, Ohio State
All-Big Ten First Team	Diamond Miller, Maryland	Diamond Miller, Maryland
All-Big Ten First Team	Jaz Shelley, Nebraska	Shyanne Sellers, Maryland
All-Big Ten Second Team	Kendall Bostic, Illinois	Kendall Bostic, Illinois
All-Big Ten Second Team	Genesis Bryant, Illinois	Genesis Bryant, Illinois
All-Big Ten Second Team	Abby Meyers, Maryland	Chloe Moore-McNeil, Indiana
All-Big Ten Second Team	Shyanne Sellers, Maryland	Abby Meyers, Maryland
All-Big Ten Second Team	Laila Phelia, Michigan	Emily Kiser, Michigan
All-Big Ten Second Team	Alexis Markowski, Nebraska	Laila Phelia, Michigan
All-Big Ten Second Team	Cotie McMahon, Ohio State	Alexis Markowski, Nebraska
All-Big Ten Second Team	Taylor Thierry, Ohio State	Jaz Shelley, Nebraska
All-Big Ten Second Team	Makenna Marisa, Penn State	Cotie McMahon, Ohio State
All-Big Ten Second Team	Jeanea Terry, Purdue	Taylor Thierry, Ohio State
All-Big Ten Second Team	Kaylene Smikle, Rutgers	Kaylene Smikle, Rutgers
All-Big Ten Honorable Mention	Adalia McKenzie, Illinois	Adalia McKenzie, Illinois
All-Big Ten Honorable Mention	Yarden Garzon, Indiana	Yarden Garzon, Indiana
All-Big Ten Honorable Mention	Chloe Moore-McNeil, Indiana	Sydney Parrish, Indiana
All-Big Ten Honorable Mention	Sydney Parrish, Indiana	Sara Scalia, Indiana
All-Big Ten Honorable Mention	McKenna Warnock, Iowa	McKenna Warnock, Iowa
All-Big Ten Honorable Mention	Matilda Ekh, Michigan State	Matilda Ekh, Michigan State
All-Big Ten Honorable Mention	DeeDee Hagemann, Michigan State	DeeDee Hagemann, Michigan State
All-Big Ten Honorable Mention	Alanna Micheaux, Minnesota	Kamaria McDaniel, Michigan State
All-Big Ten Honorable Mention	Isabelle Bourne, Nebraska	Alanna Micheaux, Minnesota
All-Big Ten Honorable Mention	Abbey Ellis, Purdue	Isabelle Bourne, Nebraska
All-Big Ten Honorable Mention	Julie Pospíšilová, Wisconsin	Sam Haiby, Nebraska
All-Big Ten Honorable Mention	Not Selected	Sydney Wood, Northwestern
All-Big Ten Honorable Mention	Not Selected	Rikki Harris, Ohio State
All-Big Ten Honorable Mention	Not Selected	Rebeka Mikulášiková, Ohio State
All-Big Ten Honorable Mention	Not Selected	Leilani Kapinus, Penn State
All-Big Ten Honorable Mention	Not Selected	Abbey Ellis, Purdue
All-Big Ten Honorable Mention	Not Selected	Jeanae Terry, Purdue
All-Big Ten Honorable Mention	Not Selected	Chyna Cornwell, Rutgers
All-Big Ten Honorable Mention	Not Selected	Julie Pospíšilová, Wisconsin
All-Freshman Team	Mara Braun, Minnesota	Mara Braun, Minnesota
All-Freshman Team	Yarden Garzon, Indiana	Yarden Garzon, Indiana
All-Freshman Team	Cotie McMahon, Ohio State	Cotie McMahon, Ohio State
All-Freshman Team	Kaylene Smikle, Rutgers	Kaylene Smikle, Rutgers
All-Freshman Team	Serah Williams, Wisconsin	Serah Williams, Wisconsin
All-Defensive Team	Mackenzie Holmes, Indiana	Mackenzie Holmes, Indiana
All-Defensive Team	Leilani Kapinus, Penn State	Leilani Kapinus, Penn State
All-Defensive Team	Chloe Moore-McNeil, Indiana	Shyanne Sellers, Maryland
All-Defensive Team	Shyanne Sellers, Maryland	Jeanae Terry, Purdue
All-Defensive Team	Taylor Thierry, Ohio State	Sydney Wood, Northwestern
All-Defensive Team	Sydney Wood, Northwestern	Not Selected (Note: The coaches' All-Defensive Team had 6 members due to a tie in voting.)
