= 2022–23 Atlantic Coast Conference women's basketball season =

- League: NCAA Division I
- Sport: Basketball
- Teams: 15
- TV partner(s): ACC Network, ESPN, Regional Sports Networks

WNBA Draft
- Top draft pick: Kayana Traylor, Virginia Tech
- Picked by: Chicago Sky, 23rd overall

2022–23 NCAA Division I women's basketball season
- Regular season Champions: Notre Dame
- Runners-up: Duke; Virginia Tech
- Season MVP: Elizabeth Kitley, Virginia Tech
- Top scorer: Ta'Niya Latson – 21.26 ppg

ACC Tournament
- Champions: Virginia Tech
- Finals MVP: Georgia Amoore, Virginia Tech

Atlantic Coast Conference women's basketball seasons
- ← 2021–22 2023–24 →

2022–23 ACC women's basketball standings
	Conf.				Overall
Team	W		L	PCT	W		L	PCT
No. 10т Notre Dame	15	–	3	.833	27	–	6	.818
No. 13 Duke	14	–	4	.778	26	–	7	.788
No. 4 Virginia Tech †	14	–	4	.778	31	–	4	.886
Louisville	12	–	6	.667	26	–	12	.684
Florida State	12	–	6	.667	23	–	10	.697
Miami (FL)	11	–	7	.611	22	–	13	.629
No. 20 North Carolina	11	–	7	.611	22	–	11	.667
NC State	9	–	9	.500	20	–	12	.625
Syracuse	9	–	9	.500	20	–	13	.606
Clemson	7	–	11	.389	19	–	16	.543
Boston College	5	–	13	.278	16	–	17	.485
Wake Forest	5	–	13	.278	17	–	17	.500
Virginia	4	–	14	.222	15	–	15	.500
Georgia Tech	4	–	14	.222	13	–	17	.433
Pittsburgh	3	–	15	.167	10	–	20	.333
† 2023 ACC tournament winner As of March 27, 2023; Rankings from AP poll

The 2022–23 Atlantic Coast Conference women's basketball season began with practices in October 2022, followed by the start of the 2022–23 NCAA Division I women's basketball season in November. Conference play started in November 2022 and concluded on February 26, 2023. After the regular season, the 2023 ACC women's basketball tournament was held at the Greensboro Coliseum in Greensboro, NC for the 23rd time in 24 years.

Notre Dame was the regular season champions with a 15–3 conference record. Virginia Tech won the ACC Tournament title over Louisville 75–67. The ACC had eight teams selected for the NCAA tournament, with Virginia Tech being the best performing, reaching the Final Four. The conference's overall record was 14–8 in the tournament. Three ACC teams participated in the WNIT. Two teams reached the Super 16 and their overall record was 5–3 in the tournament.

== Head coaches ==
=== Coaching changes ===
- On March 21, 2022, Sue Semrau announced her retirement after 24 seasons as head coach at Florida State. She was succeeded by Seminoles associate head coach Brooke Wyckoff, who served as the interim head coach for the team during the 2020–21 season during Semrau's leave of absence.
- On March 26, 2022, Felisha Legette-Jack was announced as the head coach at Syracuse. She took over from interim head coach Von Read.
- On March 3, 2022 Virginia fired head coach Tina Thompson after four years as head coach and a 30–63 overall record. On March 21, 2022, Virginia announced that Amaka Agugua-Hamilton would be the new head coach of the program.
- On May 11, 2022 Wake Forest fired head coach Jen Hoover after ten seasons. Megan Gebbia was announced as the new head coach on May 26, 2022.

=== Coaches ===
Team	Head coach	Previous job	Years at school	Record at school	ACC record	ACC titles	NCAA tournaments	NCAA Final Fours	NCAA Championships
Boston College	Joanna Bernabei-McNamee	Albany	5	62–52	26–39	0	0	0	0
Clemson	Amanda Butler	Florida	5	50–71	20–49	0	1	0	0
Duke	Kara Lawson	Boston Celtics (Assistant)	3	20–14	7–11	0	0	0	0
Florida State	Brooke Wyckoff	Florida State (Assistant)	2	10–9	9–7	0	1	0	0
Georgia Tech	Nell Fortner	Auburn	4	58–31	33–21	0	2	0	0
Louisville	Jeff Walz	Maryland (Assistant)	16	401–109	180–54	1	7	4	0
Miami	Katie Meier	Charlotte	18	324–211	136–132	1	9	0	0
NC State	Wes Moore	Chattanooga	10	222–68	107–40	3	6	0	0
North Carolina	Courtney Banghart	Princeton	4	54–32	28–25	0	2	0	0
Notre Dame	Niele Ivey	Memphis Grizzlies (Assistant)	3	34–20	21–12	0	1	0	0
Pittsburgh	Lance White	Florida State (Assistant)	5	32–79	8–59	0	0	0	0
Syracuse	Felisha Legette-Jack	Buffalo	1	0–0	0–0	0	0	0	0
Virginia	Amaka Agugua-Hamilton	Missouri State	1	0–0	0–0	0	0	0	0
Virginia Tech	Kenny Brooks	James Madison	7	124–69	48–52	0	2	0	0
Wake Forest	Megan Gebbia	American	1	0–0	0–0	0	0	0	0

Notes:

- Year at school includes 2022–23 season.
- Overall and ACC records are from time at current school and are through the end the 2021–22 season.
- NCAA tournament appearances are from time at current school only.
- NCAA Final Fours and Championship include time at other schools

== Preseason ==
=== Preseason watch lists ===
Below is a table of notable preseason watch lists.

**Lieberman**	**Drysdale**	**Miller**	**McClain**	**Leslie**	**Naismith**
Chrislyn Carr – Louisville; Haley Cavinder – Miami; Deja Kelly – North Carolina; Olivia Miles – Notre Dame; Dyaisha Fair – Syracuse	Celeste Taylor – Duke; Cameron Swartz – Georgia Tech; Hailey Van Lith – Louisville; Jakia Brown-Turner – NC State; Ashley Owusu – Virginia Tech	Elizabeth Balogun – Duke; Morgan Jones – Louisville; Mimi Collins – NC State; Alyssa Ustby – North Carolina; Taylor Soule – Virginia Tech	Olivia Cochran – Louisville; Maddy Westbeld – Notre Dame; Sam Brunelle – Virginia	Kennedy Brown – Duke; Josie Williams – Louisville; Lauren Ebo – Notre Dame; Elizabeth Kitley – Virginia Tech	Morgan Jones – Louisville; Hailey Van Lith – Louisville; Deja Kelly – North Carolina; Alyssa Ustby – North Carolina; Jakia Brown-Turner – NC State; Diamond Johnson– NC State; Olivia Miles – Notre Dame; Elizabeth Kitley – Virginia Tech; Ashley Owusu – Virginia Tech

=== ACC Women's Basketball Tip-off ===
The Preseason Media Poll and Preseason All-ACC teams were released after a tipoff event held at the Westin in Charlotte, North Carolina on October 11, 2022.

At the media day, both the head coaches and the Blue Ribbon Panel predicted that Louisville would be league champion. In prior seasons, the league released a poll of head coaches and a Blue Ribbon Panel poll, but this year those polls were combined. The votes from the league's head coaches counted twice in the combined poll.

==== ACC Preseason poll ====
1. Louisville – 1,068 (31)
2. Virginia Tech – 984 (17)
3. NC State – 963 (8)
4. Notre Dame – 942 (4)
5. North Carolina – 895
6. Miami – 674
7. Duke – 627
8. Georgia Tech – 623
9. Florida State – 553
10. Syracuse – 379
11. Virginia – 303
12. Clemson – 275
13. Boston College – 271
14. Wake Forest – 256
15. Pittsburgh – 187

First-place votes shown in parentheses.

==== Preseason All-ACC Team ====
Position	Player	Class	School
C	**Elizabeth Kitley** (49)	Senior	Virginia Tech
G	Hailey Van Lith (7)	Junior	Louisville
G	Morgan Jones (1)	Graduate Student	Louisville
G	Olivia Miles (3)	Sophomore	Notre Dame
G	Deja Kelly	Junior	North Carolina
G	Diamond Johnson	Junior	NC State
G	Jewel Spear	Junior	Wake Forest
G	Ashley Owusu	Senior	Virginia Tech
G	Taylor Soule	Graduate Student	Virginia Tech
F	Jakia Brown-Turner	Senior	NC State

ACC Preseason Player of the Year shown in Bold.
First-place votes shown in parentheses.

==== Newcomer Watchlist ====
Position	Player	School
G	Ashley Owusu	Virginia Tech
G	Saniya Rivers	NC State
G	Dyaisha Fair	Syracuse
G	Ta'Niya Latson	Florida State
G	Haley Cavinder	Miami
G	Ruby Whitehorn	Clemson

== Regular season ==
=== Records against other conferences ===
2022–23 records against non-conference foes as of (December 22, 2022):

Regular season

Power 7 Conferences	Record
American	5–1
Big East	3–5
Big Ten	11–10
Big 12	4–2
Pac-12	4–0
SEC	9–6
Power 7 Conferences Total	36–24
Other NCAA Division 1 Conferences	Record
America East	6–0
A-10	10–0
ASUN	9–0
Big Sky	1–0
Big South	14–0
Big West	0–0
CAA	10–0
C-USA	4–1
Horizon	1–0
Ivy League	2–2
MAAC	3–0
MAC	6–1
MEAC	6–0
MVC	3–0
Mountain West	1–0
NEC	4–0
OVC	1–0
Patriot League	9–0
SoCon	5–0
Southland	0–0
SWAC	3–0
Summit League	0–1
Sun Belt	5–0
WAC	0–1
WCC	0–1
Other Division I Total	103–7
NCAA Division I Total	139–31

Post Season

Power 7 Conferences	Record
American	0–0
Big East	0–0
Big Ten	0–0
Big 12	0–0
Pac-12	0–0
SEC	0–0
Power 7 Conferences Total	0–0
Other NCAA Division 1 Conferences	Record
America East	0–0
A-10	0–0
ASUN	0–0
Big Sky	0–0
Big South	0–0
Big West	0–0
CAA	0–0
C-USA	0–0
Horizon	0–0
Ivy League	0–0
MAAC	0–0
MAC	0–0
MEAC	0–0
MVC	0–0
Mountain West	0–0
NEC	0–0
OVC	0–0
Patriot League	0–0
SoCon	0–0
Southland	0–0
SWAC	0–0
Summit League	0–0
Sun Belt	0–0
WAC	0–0
WCC	0–0
Other Division I Total	0–0
NCAA Division I Total	0–0

=== Record against ranked non-conference opponents ===
This is a list of games against ranked opponents only (rankings from the AP Poll):

Date	Visitor	Home	Site	Significance	Score	Conference record
Nov 13	No. 14 Ohio State	Boston College	Conte Forum • Chestnut Hill, MA	—	L 64–82	0–1
Nov 17	No. 1 South Carolina	Clemson	Littlejohn Coliseum • Clemson, MD	Rivalry	L 31–85	0–2
Nov 20	No. 10 NC State	No. 5 UConn	XL Center • Hartford, CT	―	L 69–91	0–3
Nov 20	No. 3 Texas	No. 6 Louisville †	Imperial Arena • Paradise Island, Bahamas	Battle 4 Atlantis	W 71–63	1–3
Nov 24	No. 18 Oregon	No. 8 North Carolina †	Chiles Center • Portland, OR	Phil Knight Invitational	W 85–79	2–3
Nov 24	No. 25 Kansas State	Clemson †	Sports and Fitness Center • Saint Thomas, U.S. Virgin Islands	Paradise Jam	L 38–77	2–4
Nov 25	Duke	No. 3 UConn †	Moda Center • Portland, OR	Phil Knight Legacy	L 50–78	2–5
Nov 27	Pittsburgh	No. 14 Maryland †	Suncoast Credit Union Arena • Fort Myers, FL	Fort Myers Tip-Off	L 63–87	2–6
Nov 27	No. 8 North Carolina	No. 5 Iowa State †	Moda Center • Portland, OR	Phil Knight Invitational	W 73–64	3–6
Nov 30	No. 4 Ohio State	No. 18 Louisville	KFC Yum! Center • Louisville, KY	ACC–Big Ten Women's Challenge	L 77–96	3–7
Dec 1	No. 6 North Carolina	No. 5 Indiana	Simon Skjodt Assembly Hall • Bloomington, IN	ACC–Big Ten Women's Challenge	L 63–87	3–8
Dec 1	No. 20 Maryland	No. 7 Notre Dame	Edmund P. Joyce Center • South Bend, IN	ACC–Big Ten Women's Challenge	L 72–74	3–9
Dec 1	No. 12 NC State	No. 10 Iowa	Carver–Hawkeye Arena • Iowa City, IA	ACC–Big Ten Women's Challenge	W 94–81	4–9
Dec 1	No. 17 Michigan	Miami (FL)	Watsco Center • Coral Gables, FL	ACC–Big Ten Women's Challenge	L 64–76	4–10
Dec 4	No. 3 UConn	No. 7 Notre Dame	Edmund P. Joyce Center • South Bend, IN	―	W 74–60	5–10
Dec 18	Florida State	No. 9 UConn †	Mohegan Sun Arena • Uncasville, CT	Basketball Hall of Fame Women's Showcase	L 77–85	5–11
Dec 20	No. 6 North Carolina	No. 19 Michigan †	Spectrum Center • Charlotte, NC	Jumpman Invitational	L 68–76	5–12

Team rankings are reflective of AP poll when the game was played, not current or final ranking

† denotes game was played on neutral site

=== Rankings ===
Legend
Increase in ranking
Decrease in ranking
Not ranked previous week
First Place votes shown in ()

		Pre	Wk 2	Wk 3	Wk 4	Wk 5	Wk 6	Wk 7	Wk 8	Wk 9	Wk 10	Wk 11	Wk 12	Wk 13	Wk 14	Wk 15	Wk 16	Wk 17	Wk 18	Wk 19	Final
Boston College	AP																				
Boston College	C																				
Clemson	AP																				
Clemson	C																				
Duke	AP	RV	RV	RV	RV	RV	RV	RV	RV	19	16	13	16	16	9	9	11	13	13	13	
Duke	C					RV	RV	RV	RV	22	19	14	16	15	11	11	12	12	14	13	16
Florida State	AP					RV	RV			RV	RV	RV	24	23	19	24	23	RV	RV	RV	
Florida State	C					RV	RV			RV	RV	RV	RV	RV	24	RV	RV	RV			
Georgia Tech	AP																				
Georgia Tech	C																				
Louisville	AP	7	6	10	18	RV	RV	RV	RV		RV	RV			RV	RV	RV	RV	RV	RV	
Louisville	C	5	4	12	15	24	25	RV	RV	RV	RV	RV	RV			RV	RV	RV	RV	RV	14
Miami	AP	RV	RV			RV					RV	RV									
Miami	C	RV	RV								RV	RV									18
North Carolina	AP	12	13	8	6	8т	7	6	13	22	22	17	15	11	14	19	22	18	19	20	
North Carolina	C	12	13	10	6	9	7	7	12	18	22	20	19	14	16	17	21	19	19	19	21
NC State	AP	10	10	13	12	8т	8	7	6	10	11	20	20	15	22	RV	RV	RV	RV	RV	
NC State	C	8	7	11	11	10	8	6	6	9	12	18	18	13	20	24	RV	RV	RV	RV	RV
Notre Dame	AP	9	9	7	7	5	5	5	5	4	7	7	7	9	10	10	10	10	11	10т	
Notre Dame	C	10	11	7	7	5	5	5	5	4	7	7	7	8	10	10	10	10	10	11	11
Pittsburgh	AP																				
Pittsburgh	C																				
Syracuse	AP																				
Syracuse	C																				
Virginia	AP				RV	RV	RV	RV													
Virginia	C					RV	RV	25	RV	RV											
Virginia Tech	AP	13	14	11	9	7	6	8	7	9	13	12	12	13	11	11	9	8	4	4	
Virginia Tech	C	13	14	9	9	7	6	8	7	10	13	10	10	11	9	9	9	8	6	5	4
Wake Forest	AP																				
Wake Forest	C																				

Note: The Coaches Poll releases a final poll after the NCAA tournament, but the AP Poll does not release a poll at this time.

=== Conference Matrix ===
This table summarizes the head-to-head results between teams in conference play. Each team played 18 conference games, and at least 1 against each opponent.

	Boston College	Clemson	Duke	Florida State	Georgia Tech	Louisville	Miami	North Carolina	NC State	Notre Dame	Pittsburgh	Syracuse	Virginia	Virginia Tech	Wake Forest
vs. Boston College	–	67–57	68–27	71–77 (OT)	62–74	73–65; 62–52	86–65	73–55	71–79	85–48; 72–59	60–74; 75–64	83–73; 79–72	66–50	73–58	63–73
vs. Clemson	57–67	–	66–56	93–62; 61–74	85–74; 41–57	81–69	69–66 (OT); 59–54	69–58	77–59	57–54	57–72	91–77	69–79	59–64	59–60; 69–64 (OT)
vs. Duke	27–68	56–66	–	70–57	47–65	56–63	40–50	61–56; 45–41	72–58; 62–77	52–57	44–53	50–62	56–70; 52–56	55–66; 61–45	50–60
vs. Florida State	77–71 (OT)	62–93; 74–61	57–70	–	58–99; 66–80	82–75	85–92; 86–82	71–78	72–91	70–47	37–74	65–78	68–77	84–70	44–72; 60–61
vs. Georgia Tech	74–62	74–85; 57–41	65–47	99–58; 80–66	–	63–55	69–60; 64–58	70–57	62–68	76–53	85–79 (2OT)	57–69	69–63	65–52	51–50; 55–63
vs. Louisville	65–73; 52–62	69–81	63–56	75–82	55–63	–	57–71	55–62	63–51	78–76 (OT); 68–65	53–77; 69–76	77–86; 67–79	53–63	81–79	68–57
vs. Miami	65–86	66–69 (OT); 54–59	50–40	92–85; 82–86	60–69; 58–64	71–57	–	58–62	71–61	66–63	67–74	77–68	74–85	66–77	43–55; 55–52
vs. North Carolina	55–73	58–69	56–61; 41–45	78–71	57–70	62–55	62–58	–	47–56; 77–66 (OT)	50–60	57–72	75–67	59–70; 62–73	68–65; 61–59	58–71
vs. NC State	79–71	59–77	58–72; 77–62	91–72	68–62	51–63	61–71	56–47; 66–77 (OT)	–	65–69	63–68	54–56	62–87; 71–59	73–61; 75–62	42–51
vs. Notre Dame	48–85; 59–72	54–57	57–52	47–70	53–76	76–78 (OT); 65–68	63–66	60–50	69–65	–	63–69; 43–83	56–72; 64–73	54–76	52–63	47–86
vs. Pittsburgh	74–60; 64–75	72–57	53–44	74–37	79–85 (2OT)	77–53; 76–69	74–67	72–57	68–63	69–63; 83–43	–	89–71; 85–55	51–60	69–62	66–51
vs. Syracuse	73–83; 72–79	77–91	62–50	78–65	69–57	86–77; 79–67	68–77	67–75	56–54	72–56; 73–64	71–89; 55–85	–	72–90	78–64	58–67
vs. Virginia	50–66	79–69	70–56; 56–52	77–68	63–69	63–53	85–74	70–59; 73–62	87–62; 59–71	76–54	60–51	90–72	–	74–66; 72–60	52–72
vs. Virginia Tech	58–73	64–59	66–55; 45–61	70–84	52–65	79–81	77–66	65–68; 59–61	61–73; 62–75	63–52	62–69	64–78	66–74; 60–72	–	57–74
vs. Wake Forest	73–63	60–59; 64–69 (OT)	60–50	72–44; 61–60	50–51; 63–55	57–68	55–43; 52–55	71–58	51–42	86–47	51–66	67–58	72–52	74–57	–
Total	5–13	7–11	14–4	12–6	4–14	12–6	11–7	11–7	9–9	15–3	3–15	9–9	4–14	14–4	5–13

=== Player of the week ===
Throughout the conference regular season, the Atlantic Coast Conference offices named a Player(s) of the week and a Rookie(s) of the week.

Week	Player of the week	Rookie of the week	Reference
Week 1 – Nov 14	Ta'Niya Latson – Florida State	Ta'Niya Latson – Florida State	
Week 2 – Nov 21	Ta'niya Latson (2) – Florida State	Ta'niya Latson (2) – Florida State	
Week 3 – Nov 28	Deja Kelly – North Carolina	Ta'niya Latson (3) – Florida State	
Week 4 – Dec 5	Olivia Miles – Notre Dame	Ta'niya Latson (4) – Florida State	
Week 5 – Dec 12	Elizabeth Kitley – Virginia Tech	Ta'niya Latson (5) – Florida State	
Week 6 – Dec 19	Olivia Miles (2) – Notre Dame	Ta'niya Latson (6) – Florida State	
Week 7 – Dec 27	Chrislyn Carr – Louisville	Ta'niya Latson (7) – Florida State	
Week 8 – Jan 2	Ta'niya Latson (3) – Florida State	Ta'niya Latson (8) – Florida State	
Week 9 – Jan 9	Dontavia Waggoner – Boston College	Taina Maira – Boston College	
Week 10 – Jan 16	Hailey Van Lith – Louisville	Ta'niya Latson (9) – Florida State	
Week 11 – Jan 23	Elizabeth Kitley (2) – Virginia Tech	Tonie Morgan – Georgia Tech	
Week 12 – Jan 30	Dyaisha Fair – Syracuse	Paulina Paris – North Carolina	
Week 13 – Feb 6	Jasmyne Roberts – Miami	Tonie Morgan (2) – Georgia Tech	
Week 14 – Feb 13	Georgia Amoore – Virginia Tech	Kayla McPherson – North Carolina	
Week 15 – Feb 20	Elizabeth Kitley (3) – Virginia Tech	Ta'niya Latson (10) – Florida State	
Week 16 – Feb 27	Elizabeth Kitley (4) – Virginia Tech	KK Bransford – Georgia Tech	

== Postseason ==
=== ACC Tournament ===
First round
12	Wake Forest	68
13	Virginia	57
10	Clemson	71
15	Pittsburgh	53
11	Boston College	62
14	Georgia Tech	57

Second round
8	NC State	83
9	Syracuse	58
5	Florida State	54
12	Wake Forest	65
7	North Carolina	68
10	Clemson	58
6	Miami	84
11	Boston College	69

Quarterfinals
1	Notre Dame	66
8	NC State	60
4	Louisville	74
12	Wake Forest	48
2	Duke	44
7	North Carolina	40
3	Virginia Tech	68
6	Miami	42

Semifinals
1	Notre Dame	38
4	Louisville	64
2	Duke	37
3	Virginia Tech	58

Championship
4	Louisville	67
3	Virginia Tech	75

=== NCAA tournament ===
Seed	Region	School	1st Round	2nd Round	Sweet 16	Elite Eight	Final Four	Championship
1	Seattle 3	Virginia Tech	W 58–33 vs. #16 Chattanooga – (Blacksburg, VA)	W 72–60 vs. #9 South Dakota State – (Blacksburg, VA)	W 73–64 vs. #4 Tennessee – (Seattle, WA)	W 84–74 vs. #3 Ohio State – (Seattle, WA)	L 72–79 vs. #3 LSU – (Dallas, TX)	
3	Greenville 1	Notre Dame	W 82–56 vs. #14 Southern Utah – (Notre Dame, IN)	W 53–48 vs. #11 Mississippi State – (Notre Dame, IN)	L 59–76 vs. #2 Maryland – (Greenville, SC)			
3	Seattle 4	Duke	W 89–49 vs. #14 Iona – (Durham, NC)	L 53–61 (OT) vs. #6 Colorado – (Durham, NC)				
5	Seattle 4	Louisville	W 83–81 vs. #12 Drake – (Austin, TX)	W 73–51 vs. #4 Texas – (Austin, TX)	W 72–62 vs. # 8 Ole Miss – (Seattle, WA)	L 83–97 vs. #2 Iowa – (Seattle, WA)		
6	Seattle 3	North Carolina	W 61–59 vs. #11 St. John's – (Columbus, OH)	L 69–71 vs. #3 Ohio State – (Columbus, OH)				
7	Seattle 4	Florida State	L 54–66 vs. #10 Georgia – (Iowa City, IA)					
7	Greenville 2	NC State	L 63–64 vs. #10 Princeton – (Salt Lake City, UT)					
9	Greenville 2	Miami (FL)	W 62–61 vs. #8 Oklahoma State – (Bloomington, IN)	W 70–68 vs. #1 Indiana – (Bloomington, IN)	W 70–65 vs. #4 Villanova – (Greenville, SC)	L 42–54 vs. #3 LSU – (Greenville, SC)		
		W–L (%):	6–2 (.750)	4–2 (.667)	3–1 (.750)	1–2 (.333)	0–1 (.000)	0–0 (–) Total: 14–8 (.636)

=== National Invitation Tournament ===
Bracket	School	First round	Second round	Third round	Quarterfinals	Semifinals	Championship
Region 4	Clemson	W 66–46 vs. High Point – (Clemson, SC)	W 56–55 vs. Auburn – (Clemson, SC)	L 63–73 vs. Florida – (Clemson, SC)			
Region 3	Syracuse	W 84–56 vs. Kent State – (Syracuse, NY)	W 72–54 @ Seton Hall – (South Orange, NJ)	L 82–88 @ Columbia – (New York, NY)			
Region 4	Wake Forest	W 75–49 vs. Morgan State – (Winston-Salem, NC)	L 63–80 vs. Florida – (Winston-Salem, NC)				
	W–L (%):	3–0 (1.000)	2–1 (.667)	0–2 (.000)	0–0 (–)	0–0 (–)	0–0 (–) Total: 5–3 (.625)

== Honors and awards ==
Associated Press	WCBA	USBWA
First Team
None	None	None
Second Team
Elizabeth Kitley; Olivia Miles	Elizabeth Kitley	Elizabeth Kitley
Third Team
None	Olivia Miles	Olivia Miles

=== ACC Awards ===
The ACC announced its end of season awards on February 28, 2023 ahead of the start of the ACC tournament.

2022-23 ACC Women's Basketball Individual Awards
Award	Recipient(s)
Player of the Year	Elizabeth Kitley – Virginia Tech
Coach of the Year	Niele Ivey – Notre Dame
Defensive Player of the Year	Celeste Taylor – Duke
Freshman of the Year	Ta'Niya Latson – Florida State
Sixth Player of the Year	Saniya Rivers – NC State
Most Improved Player	Makayla Timpson – Florida State

2022-23 ACC Women's Basketball All-Conference Teams
First Team	Second Team	Freshman Team
Elizabeth Kitley – Virginia Tech; Olivia Miles – Notre Dame; Ta'Niya Latson – Florida State; Hailey Van Lith – Louisville; Georgia Amoore – Virginia Tech; Dyaisha Fair – Syracuse; Deja Kelly – North Carolina; Celeste Taylor – Duke; Sonia Citron – Notre Dame; Alyssa Ustby – North Carolina	Makayla Timpson – Florida State; Jewel Spear – Wake Forest; Diamond Johnson – NC State; Haley Cavinder – Miami; Destiny Harden – Miami; Amari Robinson – Clemson; Camryn Taylor – Virginia; Maddy Westbeld – Notre Dame; Kennedy Todd-Williams – North Carolina; Taylor Soule – Virginia Tech	Ta'Niya Latson – Florida State; Taina Mair – Boston College; Tonie Morgan – Georgia Tech; Ruby Whitehorn – Clemson; KK Bransford – Notre Dame

2022-23 ACC Women's Basketball All-ACC Defensive Team
Player	Team
Celeste Taylor	Duke
Mykasa Robinson	Louisville
Elizabeth Kitley	Virginia Tech
Makayla Timpson	Florida State
Dyaisha Fair	Syracuse

== WNBA draft ==
The ACC had three players selected in the 2023 WNBA draft. This was the first time since the 2005 WNBA draft than an ACC player was not selected in the first round, breaking a streak of seventeen straight years with a first round selection.

Player	Team	Round	Pick #	Position	School
Kayana Traylor	Chicago Sky	2	23	G	Virginia Tech
Destiny Harden	Phoenix Mercury	3	27	F	Miami
Taylor Soule	Minnesota Lynx	3	28	F	Virginia Tech
