= 2022–23 Duke Blue Devils women's basketball team =

Intercollegiate basketball season

2022–23 Duke Blue Devils women's basketball

NCAA tournament, Second Round
- Conference: Atlantic Coast Conference

Ranking
- Coaches: No. 16
- AP: No. 13
- Record: 26–7 (14–4 ACC)
- Head coach: Kara Lawson (3rd season)
- Assistant coaches: Tia Jackson; Winston Gandy; Karen Lange
- Home arena: Cameron Indoor Stadium

2022–23 ACC women's basketball standings
	Conf.				Overall
Team	W		L	PCT	W		L	PCT
No. 10т Notre Dame	15	–	3	.833	27	–	6	.818
No. 13 Duke	14	–	4	.778	26	–	7	.788
No. 4 Virginia Tech †	14	–	4	.778	31	–	4	.886
Louisville	12	–	6	.667	26	–	12	.684
Florida State	12	–	6	.667	23	–	10	.697
Miami (FL)	11	–	7	.611	22	–	13	.629
No. 20 North Carolina	11	–	7	.611	22	–	11	.667
NC State	9	–	9	.500	20	–	12	.625
Syracuse	9	–	9	.500	20	–	13	.606
Clemson	7	–	11	.389	19	–	16	.543
Boston College	5	–	13	.278	16	–	17	.485
Wake Forest	5	–	13	.278	17	–	17	.500
Virginia	4	–	14	.222	15	–	15	.500
Georgia Tech	4	–	14	.222	13	–	17	.433
Pittsburgh	3	–	15	.167	10	–	20	.333
† 2023 ACC tournament winner As of March 27, 2023; Rankings from AP poll

The 2022–23 Duke Blue Devils women's basketball team represented Duke University during the 2022–23 NCAA Division I women's basketball season. The Blue Devils were led by third year head coach Kara Lawson and played their home games at Cameron Indoor Stadium in Durham, North Carolina as members of the Atlantic Coast Conference.

The Blue Devils finished the season 26–7 overall and 14–4 in ACC play to finish in a tie for second place. As the second seed in the ACC tournament they earned a bye into the Quarterfinals where they defeated rivals seventh seeded North Carolina before falling to eventual champions and third seed Virginia Tech in the Semifinals. They received an at-large bid to the NCAA Tournament and were the third seed in the Seattle 4 Region. They defeated fourteen seed Iona in the first round before being upset by sixth seed Colorado in the second round, in overtime, to end their season.

== Previous season ==
The Blue Devils finished the season 17–13 overall and 7–11 in ACC play to finish in tenth place. As the tenth seed in the ACC tournament, they defeated Pittsburgh in the First Round before losing to seventh seed Miami in the Second Round. They were not invited to the NCAA tournament or the WNIT despite being ranked as high as No. 15 during the regular season.

== Off-season ==
=== Departures ===
Departures
Name	Number	Pos.	Height	Year	Hometown	Reason for departure
Miela Goodchild	3	G	5'10"	Senior	Queensland, Australia	Graduated
Amaya Finklea-Guity	22	C	6'4"	Graduate Student	Dorchester, Massachusetts	Graduated
Onome Akinbode-James	24	F/C	6'3"	Senior	Abeokuta, Nigeria	Graduated
Jade Williams	25	F/C	6'5"	Senior	The Colony, Texas	Graduated
Nyah Green	31	G	6'1"	Junior	Allen, Texas	Graduated
Lexi Gordon	34	G/F	6'0"	Graduate Student	Waukee, Iowa	Graduated

=== Incoming transfers ===
Incoming transfers
Name	Number	Pos.	Height	Year	Hometown	Previous school
Taya Corosdale	5	G/F	6'3"	Graduate Student	Bothell, Washington	Oregon State
Kennedy Brown	21	C	6'6"	Junior	Derby, Kansas	Oregon State
Reigan Richardson	24	G	5'11"	Sophomore	Charlotte, North Carolina	Georgia
Bo Shaffer	32	G	5'7"	Graduate Student	Lakewood, Colorado	Colorado-Colorado Springs
Mia Heide	42	F	6'3"	Graduate Student	Austin, Texas	Tulane

=== Recruiting class ===
College recruiting
Name	Hometown	School	Height	Weight	Commit date
Ashlon Jackson; G	China, Texas	Hardin-Jefferson	5 ft 10 in (1.78 m)	N/A	
Ashlon Jackson; G	Recruit ratings: ESPN: (96)				
Shay Bollin; F	Raynham, Massachusetts	Bridgewater-Raynham	6 ft 3 in (1.91 m)	N/A	
Shay Bollin; F	Recruit ratings: ESPN: (95)				
Emma Koabel; G	Port Colborne, Ontario	Niagara Prep	5 ft 11 in (1.80 m)	N/A	
Emma Koabel; G	Recruit ratings: No ratings found				
Overall recruit ranking:
Note: In many cases, Scout, Rivals, 247Sports, On3, and ESPN may conflict in their listings of height and weight.; In these cases, the average was taken. ESPN grades are on a 100-point scale.; Sources:

== Roster ==
2022–23 Duke Blue Devils women's basketball team
Players
Coaches

Pos.	#	Name	Height	Year	Previous school	Hometown
G	0	Celeste Taylor	5 ft 11 in (1.8 m)	Sr	Long Island Lutheran; Texas	Valley Stream, NY
G	2	Vanessa de Jesus	5 ft 8 in (1.73 m)	Jr	Sierra Canyon	Valencia, CA
G	3	Ashlon Jackson	6 ft 1 in (1.85 m)	Fr	Hardin-Jefferson	China, TX
G/F	4	Elizabeth Balogun	6 ft 1 in (1.85 m)	Sr	Hamilton Heights Christian Academy; Georgia Tech; Louisville	Chattanooga, TN
G/F	5	Taya Corosdale	6 ft 3 in (1.91 m)	GS	Bothell; Oregon State	Bothell, WA
G	11	Jordyn Oliver	5 ft 10 in (1.78 m)	RS Jr	Prosper; Baylor	Prosper, TX
G	13	Lee Volker	5 ft 11 in (1.8 m)	So	St. Paul VI	Purcellville, VA
G	15	Emma Koabel	5 ft 11 in (1.8 m)	Fr	Niagara Prep	Port Colborne, ON
C	21	Kennedy Brown	6 ft 6 in (1.98 m)	Jr	Derby; Oregon State	Derby, KS
F	22	Shay Bollin	6 ft 3 in (1.91 m)	Fr	Bridgewater-Raynham	Raynham, MA
F/C	23	Imani Lewis	6 ft 3 in (1.91 m)	GS	Life Center Academy; Wisconsin	Willingboro, NJ
G	24	Reigan Richardson	5 ft 11 in (1.8 m)	So	Cannon School; Georgia	Charlotte, NC
G	30	Shayeann Day-Wilson	5 ft 6 in (1.68 m)	So	Crestwood Prep	Toronto, Canada
G	31	Bo Shaffer	5 ft 7 in (1.7 m)	GS	Bear Creek; Colorado-Colorado Springs	Lakewood, CO
G	33	Jiselle Havas	5 ft 10 in (1.78 m)	GS	Lake Highland Prep; Lafayette	Windermere, FL
F	42	Mia Heide	6 ft 3 in (1.91 m)	GS	Austin; Tulane	Austin, TX
G	45	Emma Schmidt	5 ft 9 in (1.75 m)	GS	Waukee; TCU	Waukee, IA

Head coach

- Kara Lawson (Tennessee)

Assistant coach(es)

- Tia Jackson (Iowa)
- Winston Gandy (Maryland)
- Karen Lange (Iowa)

Legend

- (C) Team captain
- (S) Suspended
- (I) Ineligible
- (W) Walk-on
- Injured
- Current redshirt

Roster
Last update: October 7, 2022

== Schedule ==
Date time, TV	Rank^{#}	Opponent^{#}	Result	Record	Site (attendance) city, state
Exhibition
November 5, 2022*; 5:00 p.m.		Indiana University of Pennsylvania	W 90–36	–	Cameron Indoor Stadium; Durham, NC
Non-conference regular season
November 7, 2022*; 11:00 a.m., ACCNX		North Carolina A&T	W 77–57	1–0	Cameron Indoor Stadium (1,002); Durham, NC
November 10, 2022*; 7:00 p.m., ACCNX		Charleston Southern	W 111–50	2–0	Cameron Indoor Stadium (1,100); Durham, NC
November 12, 2022*; 2:00 p.m., ESPN+		at Davidson	W 60–37	3–0	John M. Belk Arena (1,524); Davidson, NC
November 17, 2022*; 7:00 p.m., ACCNX		Texas A&M	W 71–52	4–0	Cameron Indoor Stadium (1,352); Durham, NC
November 20, 2022*; 1:00 p.m., ESPN+		at Toledo	W 58–41	5–0	Savage Arena (5,427); Toledo, OH
November 25, 2022*; 6:00 p.m., ESPN2		vs. No. 3 Connecticut; Phil Knight Legacy semifinal	L 50–78	5–1	Chiles Center (2,299); Portland, OR
November 27, 2022*; 10:00 p.m., ESPN2		vs. Oregon State; Phil Knight Legacy consolation game	W 54–41	6–1	Veterans Memorial Coliseum (2,807); Portland, OR
December 1, 2022*; 5:00 p.m., ACCN		Northwestern; ACC–Big Ten Women's Challenge	W 66–50	7–1	Cameron Indoor Stadium (1,089); Durham, NC
December 4, 2022*; 2:00 p.m., ESPN+		at Richmond	W 100–49	8–1	Robins Center (1,262); Richmond, VA
December 8, 2022*; 7:00 p.m., ACCNX		Austin Peay	W 74–31	9–1	Cameron Indoor Stadium (925); Durham, NC
December 11, 2022*; 1:00 p.m., ESPN+		at Florida Gulf Coast	W 71–48	10–1	Alico Arena (2,183); Fort Myers, FL
ACC regular season
December 21, 2022; 7:00 p.m., ACCNX		Virginia	W 70–56	11–1 (1–0)	Cameron Indoor Stadium (1,568); Durham, NC
December 29, 2022; 8:00 p.m., ACCN		at No. 6 NC State; Rivalry	W 72–58	12–1 (2–0)	PNC Arena (5,500); Raleigh, NC
January 1, 2023; 12:00 p.m., ACCRSN		Louisville	W 63–56	13–1 (3–0)	Cameron Indoor Stadium (1,720); Durham, NC
January 5, 2023; 6:00 p.m., ACCNX	No. 19	at Wake Forest	W 60–50	14–1 (4–0)	LJVM Coliseum (1,050); Winston-Salem, NC
January 12, 2023; 7:00 p.m., ACCNX	No. 16	Clemson	W 66–56	15–1 (5–0)	Cameron Indoor Stadium (2,134); Durham, NC
January 15, 2023; 4:00 p.m., ACCN	No. 16	at Georgia Tech	W 65–47	16–1 (6–0)	McCamish Pavilion (2,342); Atlanta, GA
January 19, 2023; 8:00 p.m., ACCN	No. 13	at No. 17 North Carolina; Rivalry	L 56–61	16–2 (6–1)	Carmichael Arena (5,003); Chapel Hill, NC
January 22, 2023; 12:00 p.m., ACCN	No. 13	Syracuse	W 62–50	17–2 (7–1)	Cameron Indoor Stadium (2,147); Durham, NC
January 26, 2023; 8:00 p.m., ACCN	No. 16	No. 12 Virginia Tech	W 66–55	18–2 (8–1)	Cameron Indoor Stadium (2,207); Durham, NC
January 29, 2023; 2:00 p.m., ACCN	No. 16	at No. 24 Florida State	L 57–70	18–3 (8–2)	Donald L. Tucker Center (2,904); Tallahassee, FL
February 2, 2023; 6:00 p.m., ACCN	No. 16	Pittsburgh	W 53–44	19–3 (9–2)	Cameron Indoor Stadium (1,741); Durham, NC
February 5, 2023; 1:00 p.m., ACCRSN	No. 16	at No. 9 Notre Dame	W 57–52	20–3 (10–2)	Purcell Pavilion (9,149); Notre Dame, IN
February 9, 2023; 7:00 p.m., ACCNX	No. 9	at Boston College	W 68–27	21–3 (11–2)	Conte Forum (2,347); Chestnut Hill, MA
February 12, 2023; 2:00 p.m., ACCRSN	No. 9	Miami (FL)	W 50–40	22–3 (12–2)	Cameron Indoor Stadium (2,449); Durham, NC
February 16, 2023; 7:00 p.m., ACCNX	No. 9	at No. 11 Virginia Tech	L 45–61	22–4 (12–3)	Cassell Coliseum (3,084); Blacksburg, VA
February 19, 2023; 2:00 p.m., ACCNX	No. 9	at Virginia	W 56–52	23–4 (13–3)	John Paul Jones Arena (6,378); Charlottesville, VA
February 23, 2023; 8:00 p.m., ACCN	No. 11	NC State; Rivalry	W 77–62	24–4 (14–3)	Cameron Indoor Stadium (3,139); Durham, NC
February 26, 2023; 12:00 p.m., ACCRSN	No. 11	No. 22 North Carolina; Rivalry	L 41–45	24–5 (14–4)	Cameron Indoor Stadium (9,314); Durham, NC
ACC Women's Tournament
March 3, 2023; 6:00 p.m., ACCN	(2) No. 13	vs. (7) No. 18 North Carolina; Quarterfinals/Rivalry	W 44–40	25–5	Greensboro Coliseum (7,823); Greensboro, NC
March 4, 2023; 2:00 p.m., ACCN	(2) No. 13	vs. (3) No. 8 Virginia Tech; Semifinals	L 37–58	25–6	Greensboro Coliseum (7,122); Greensboro, NC
NCAA Women's Tournament
March 18, 2023*; 9:30 p.m., ESPN2	(3 S4) No. 13	(14 S4) Iona; First Round	W 89–49	26–6	Cameron Indoor Stadium (2,246); Durham, NC
March 20, 2023*; 9:00 p.m., ESPNU	(3 S4) No. 13	(6 S4) No. 21 Colorado; Second Round	L 53–61 ^{OT}	26–7	Cameron Indoor Stadium (1,904); Durham, NC
*Non-conference game. ^{#}Rankings from AP Poll,. (#) Tournament seedings in parentheses. S4=Seattle 4. All times are in Eastern Time.

== Rankings ==
2022–23 NCAA Division I women's basketball rankings

Regular season polls
Poll	Pre- Season	Week 2	Week 3	Week 4	Week 5	Week 6	Week 7	Week 8	Week 9	Week 10	Week 11	Week 12	Week 13	Week 14	Week 15	Week 16	Week 17	Week 18	Week 19	Final
AP	RV	RV	RV	RV	RV	RV	RV	RV	19	16	13	16	16	9	9	11	13	13	13	N/A
Coaches					RV	RV	RV	RV	22	19	14	16	15	11	11	12	12	14	13	16

Note: The AP does not release a final poll.

Legend
	Increase in ranking
	Decrease in ranking
	Not ranked in previous week
(RV)	Received Votes
(NR)	Not Ranked

== See also ==
- 2022–23 Duke Blue Devils men's basketball team
