= 2022–23 Notre Dame Fighting Irish women's basketball team =

Intercollegiate basketball season

2022–23 Notre Dame Fighting Irish women's basketball

ACC regular season champions

NCAA tournament, Sweet Sixteen
- Conference: Atlantic Coast Conference

Ranking
- Coaches: No. 11
- AP: No. 10 (tie)
- Record: 27–6 (15–3 ACC)
- Head coach: Niele Ivey (3rd season)
- Associate head coach: Carol Owens (23rd season)
- Assistant coaches: Michaela Mabrey (4th season); Charel Allen (1st season)
- Home arena: Purcell Pavilion

2022–23 ACC women's basketball standings
	Conf.				Overall
Team	W		L	PCT	W		L	PCT
No. 10т Notre Dame	15	–	3	.833	27	–	6	.818
No. 13 Duke	14	–	4	.778	26	–	7	.788
No. 4 Virginia Tech †	14	–	4	.778	31	–	4	.886
Louisville	12	–	6	.667	26	–	12	.684
Florida State	12	–	6	.667	23	–	10	.697
Miami (FL)	11	–	7	.611	22	–	13	.629
No. 20 North Carolina	11	–	7	.611	22	–	11	.667
NC State	9	–	9	.500	20	–	12	.625
Syracuse	9	–	9	.500	20	–	13	.606
Clemson	7	–	11	.389	19	–	16	.543
Boston College	5	–	13	.278	16	–	17	.485
Wake Forest	5	–	13	.278	17	–	17	.500
Virginia	4	–	14	.222	15	–	15	.500
Georgia Tech	4	–	14	.222	13	–	17	.433
Pittsburgh	3	–	15	.167	10	–	20	.333
† 2023 ACC tournament winner As of March 27, 2023; Rankings from AP poll

The 2022–23 Notre Dame Fighting Irish women's basketball team represented the University of Notre Dame during the 2022–23 NCAA Division I women's basketball season. The Fighting Irish were led by third-year head coach Niele Ivey, and played their home games at Purcell Pavilion as members of the Atlantic Coast Conference.

The Fighting Irish finished the season 27–6 overall and 15–3 in ACC play, to finish as conference champions. This was their seventh regular season championship, and their first since 2018–19. As the first seed in the ACC tournament, they defeated eighth seed NC State in the quarterfinals before losing to fourth seed Louisville in the semifinals. They received an at-large bid to the NCAA tournament, and were the third seed in the Greenville 1 Region. They defeated fourteenth seed Southern Utah in the first round and eleventh seed Mississippi State in the second round, before losing to second seed Maryland in the Sweet Sixteen to end their season. Their postseason performance was impacted by an injury to Olivia Miles, who was an All-ACC First Team selection.

== Previous season ==
The Fighting Irish finished the season 24–10 overall and 13–5 in ACC play, to finish in a three-way tie for third place. As the third seed in the ACC tournament, they defeated sixth seed Georgia Tech in the quarterfinals before losing to seventh seed Miami in the semifinals. They received an at-large bid to the NCAA tournament and were the fifth seed in the Bridgeport Region. They defeated twelfth seed UMass in the first round and fourth seed Oklahoma in the second round, before losing to NC State in the Sweet Sixteen to end their season.

== Offseason ==
=== Departures ===
Departures
Name	Number	Pos.	Height	Year	Hometown	Reason for departure
Maya Dodson	0	F	6'3"	Graduate student	Alpharetta, Georgia	Graduated; drafted 26th overall in the 2022 WNBA draft
Katlyn Gilbert	10	G	5'10"	Senior	Indianapolis, Indiana	Graduated; Transferred to Missouri
Abby Prohaska	12	G	5'10"	Senior	Liberty Township, Ohio	Graduated; Transferred to San Diego State
Anaya Peoples	21	G	5'10"	Junior	Danville, Illinois	Transferred to DePaul
Sam Brunelle	33	F	6'2"	Junior	Ruckersville, Virginia	Transferred to Virginia

=== Incoming transfers ===
Incoming transfers
Name	Number	Pos.	Height	Year	Hometown	Previous school
Jenna Brown	0	G	5'10"	Graduate student	Atlanta, Georgia	Stanford
Lauren Zwetizg	20	G	5'9"	Junior	Fort Collins, Colorado	Haverford
Kylee Watson	22	F	6'4"	Junior	Linwood, New Jersey	Oregon
Lauren Ebo	33	C	6'4"	Graduate student	Washington, D.C.	Texas

=== 2022 recruiting class ===
College recruiting
Name	Hometown	School	Height	Weight	Commit date
KK Bransford; G	Cincinnati, Ohio	Mount Notre Dame	5 ft 10 in (1.78 m)	N/A	
KK Bransford; G	Recruit ratings: ESPN: (95)				
Overall recruit ranking:
Note: In many cases, Scout, Rivals, 247Sports, On3, and ESPN may conflict in their listings of height and weight.; In these cases, the average was taken. ESPN grades are on a 100-point scale.; Sources:

== Roster ==
2022–23 Notre Dame Fighting Irish women's basketball team
Players
Coaches

Pos.	#	Name	Height	Year	Previous school	Hometown
G	0	Jenna Brown	5 ft 10 in (1.78 m)	GS	The Lovett School; Stanford	Atlanta, GA
G	1	Dara Mabrey	5 ft 7 in (1.7 m)	GS	Manasquan; Virginia Tech	Belmar, NJ
G	2	Trinity Cha	5 ft 5 in (1.65 m)	Jr	Crean Lutheran	Irvine, CA
G	4	Cassandre Prosper	6 ft 2 in (1.88 m)	Fr	Cairine Wilson	Montreal, QC
G	5	Olivia Miles	5 ft 10 in (1.78 m)	So	Blair Academy	Phillipsburg, NJ
G	11	Sonia Citron	6 ft 1 in (1.85 m)	So	The Ursuline School	Scarsdale, NY
G	12	KK Bransford	5 ft 11 in (1.8 m)	Fr	Mount Notre Dame	Cincinnati, OH
F	15	Natalija Marshall	6 ft 5 in (1.96 m)	Jr	Christ the King	Queens, NY
G	20	Lauren Zwetzig	5 ft 9 in (1.75 m)	Jr	Fossil Ridge; Haverford	Fort Collins, CO
F	21	Maddy Westbeld	6 ft 3 in (1.91 m)	So	Fairmont	Kettering, OH
F	22	Kylee Watson	6 ft 4 in (1.93 m)	Jr	Mainland; Oregon	Linwood, NJ
G	25	Sarah Cernugel	5 ft 4 in (1.63 m)	Jr	Hinsdale Central	Westmont, IL
C	33	Lauren Ebo	6 ft 4 in (1.93 m)	GS	Riverdale Baptist; Texas	Washington, DC

Head coach

- Niele Ivey (Notre Dame)

Assistant coach(es)

- Carol Owens (Northern Illinois)
- Michaela Mabrey (Notre Dame)
- Charel Allen (Notre Dame)

Legend

- (C) Team captain
- (S) Suspended
- (I) Ineligible
- (W) Walk-on
- Injured
- Current redshirt

Roster
Last update: October 31, 2022

== Schedule and results ==
Date time, TV	Rank^{#}	Opponent^{#}	Result	Record	Site (attendance) city, state
Exhibition
October 31, 2022*; 7:00 p.m.	No. 9	Truman State	W 92–47	–	Purcell Pavilion (1,484); Notre Dame, IN
Regular season
November 7, 2022*; 7:00 p.m., ACCNX	No. 9	Northern Illinois	W 88–48	1–0	Purcell Pavilion (2,545); Notre Dame, IN
November 12, 2022*; 4:00 p.m., NBC	No. 9	vs. California; Citi Shamrock Classic	W 90–79	2–0	Enterprise Center (4,212); St. Louis, MO
November 16, 2022*; 9:00 p.m., BTN	No. 9	at Northwestern	W 92–58	3–0	Welsh–Ryan Arena (1,176); Evanston, IL
November 20, 2022*; 4:00 p.m., ACCN	No. 9	Ball State	W 95–60	4–0	Purcell Pavilion (3,438); Notre Dame, IN
November 24, 2022*; 4:15 p.m., FloSports	No. 7	vs. American; Goombay Splash	W 90–65	5–0	Gateway Christian Academy (244); Bimini, Bahamas
November 26, 2022*; 4:15 p.m., FloSports	No. 7	vs. Arizona State; Goombay Splash	W 85–65	6–0	Gateway Christian Academy (261); Bimini, Bahamas
December 1, 2022*; 6:30 p.m., ESPN2	No. 7	No. 20 Maryland; ACC–Big Ten Women's Challenge	L 72–74	6–1	Purcell Pavilion (3,131); Notre Dame, IN
December 4, 2022*; 3:00 p.m., ABC	No. 7	No. 3 Connecticut; Jimmy V Women's Classic / Rivalry	W 74–60	7–1	Purcell Pavilion (9,149); Notre Dame, IN
December 8, 2022*; 6:00 p.m.	No. 5	at Lafayette	Postponed due to health and safety protocols within the Lafayette program.		Kirby Sports Center; Easton, PA
December 10, 2022*; 12:00 p.m., ACCNX	No. 5	Merrimack	W 108–44	8–1	Purcell Pavilion (4,670); Notre Dame, IN
December 18, 2022; 4:00 p.m., ACCN	No. 5	at No. 6 Virginia Tech	W 63–52	9–1 (1–0)	Cassell Coliseum (4,206); Blacksburg, VA
December 21, 2022*; 12:00 p.m., ACCNX	No. 5	Western Michigan	W 85–57	10–1	Purcell Pavilion (4,772); Notre Dame, IN
December 29, 2022; 6:00 p.m., ACCN	No. 5	at Miami (FL)	W 66–63	11–1 (2–0)	Watsco Center (2,153); Coral Gables, FL
January 1, 2023; 12:00 p.m., ACCN	No. 5	Boston College	W 85–48	12–1 (3–0)	Purcell Pavilion (5,532); Notre Dame, IN
January 8, 2023; 4:00 p.m., ACCN	No. 4	at No. 22 North Carolina	L 50–60	12–2 (3–1)	Carmichael Arena (3,976); Chapel Hill, NC
January 12, 2023; 7:00 p.m., ACCNX	No. 7	Wake Forest	W 86–47	13–2 (4–1)	Purcell Pavilion (4,319); Notre Dame, IN
January 15, 2023; 2:00 p.m., ACCN	No. 7	at Syracuse	W 72–56	14–2 (5–1)	Carrier Dome (3,736); Syracuse, NY
January 19, 2023; 7:00 p.m., ACCRSN	No. 7	at Clemson	W 57–54	15–2 (6–1)	Littlejohn Coliseum (1,259); Clemson, SC
January 22, 2023; 2:00 p.m., ACCN	No. 7	Virginia	W 76–54	16–2 (7–1)	Purcell Pavilion (6,442); Notre Dame, IN
January 26, 2023; 8:00 p.m., ACCRSN	No. 7	No. 24 Florida State	W 70–47	17–2 (8–1)	Purcell Pavilion (4,956); Notre Dame, IN
January 29, 2023; 3:00 p.m., ESPN	No. 7	at No. 20 NC State	L 65–69	17–3 (8–2)	Reynolds Coliseum (5,500); Raleigh, NC
February 2, 2023; 7:00 p.m., ACCNX	No. 9	at Boston College	W 72–59	18–3 (9–2)	Conte Forum (1,378); Chestnut Hill, MA
February 5, 2023; 1:00 p.m., ACCRSN	No. 9	No. 16 Duke	L 52–57	18–4 (9–3)	Purcell Pavilion (9,149); Notre Dame, IN
February 9, 2023; 6:00 p.m., ACCN	No. 10	Pittsburgh	W 69–63	19–4 (10–3)	Purcell Pavilion (4,716); Notre Dame, IN
February 12, 2023; 4:00 p.m., ACCN	No. 10	Syracuse	W 73–64	20–4 (11–3)	Purcell Pavilion (5,239); Notre Dame, IN
February 16, 2023; 7:00 p.m., ESPN	No. 10	Louisville	W 78–76 ^{OT}	21–4 (12–3)	Purcell Pavilion (5,245); Notre Dame, IN
February 19, 2023; 2:00 p.m., ACCNX	No. 10	at Pittsburgh	W 83–43	22–4 (13–3)	Peterson Events Center (2,829); Pittsburgh, PA
February 23, 2023; 6:00 p.m., ACCRSN	No. 10	Georgia Tech	W 76–53	23–4 (14–3)	Purcell Pavilion (5,297); Notre Dame, IN
February 26, 2023; 12:00 p.m., ESPN	No. 10	at Louisville	W 68–65	24–4 (15–3)	KFC Yum! Center (12,015); Louisville, KY
ACC Women's Tournament
March 3, 2023; 2:00 p.m., ACCN	(1) No. 10	vs. (8) NC State; Quarterfinals	W 66–60	25–4	Greensboro, NC (6,151); Greensboro Coliseum
March 4, 2023; 12:00 p.m., ACCN	(1) No. 10	vs. (4) Louisville; Semifinals	L 38–64	25–5	Greensboro, NC (7,122); Greensboro Coliseum
NCAA Women's Tournament
March 17, 2023*; 3:30 p.m., ESPN2	(3 G1) No. 10	(14 G1) Southern Utah; First Round	W 82–56	26–5	Purcell Pavilion (3,950); Notre Dame, IN
March 19, 2023*; 3:30 p.m., ESPN	(3 G1) No. 10	(11 G1) Mississippi State; Second Round	W 53–48	27–5	Purcell Pavilion (4,565); Notre Dame, IN
March 25, 2023*; 11:30 a.m., ESPN	(3 G1) No. 10	vs. (2 G1) No. 7 Maryland; Sweet Sixteen	L 59–76	27–6	Bon Secours Wellness Arena; Greenville, SC
*Non-conference game. ^{#}Rankings from AP Poll. (#) Tournament seedings in parentheses. G1=Greenville 1. All times are in Eastern.

== Rankings ==
Regular season polls
Poll	Pre- season	Week 2	Week 3	Week 4	Week 5	Week 6	Week 7	Week 8	Week 9	Week 10	Week 11	Week 12	Week 13	Week 14	Week 15	Week 16	Week 17	Week 18	Week 19	Final
AP	9	9	7	7	5	5	5	5	4	7	7	7	9	10	10	10	10	11	10т	N/A
Coaches	10	11	7	7	5	5	5	5	4	7	7	7	8	10	10	10	10	10	11	11

Note: The AP does not release a final poll.

Legend
	Increase in ranking
	Decrease in ranking
	Not ranked in previous week
(RV)	Received votes
(NR)	Not ranked
