= 2022–23 Virginia Tech Hokies women's basketball team =

Intercollegiate basketball season

2022–23 Virginia Tech Hokies women's basketball

ACC tournament champions

NCAA tournament, Final Four
- Conference: Atlantic Coast Conference

Ranking
- Coaches: No. 4
- AP: No. 4
- Record: 31–5 (14–4 ACC)
- Head coach: Kenny Brooks (7th season)
- Assistant coaches: Lindsey Hicks; Radvile Autukaite
- Home arena: Cassell Coliseum

2022–23 ACC women's basketball standings
	Conf.				Overall
Team	W		L	PCT	W		L	PCT
No. 10т Notre Dame	15	–	3	.833	27	–	6	.818
No. 13 Duke	14	–	4	.778	26	–	7	.788
No. 4 Virginia Tech †	14	–	4	.778	31	–	4	.886
Louisville	12	–	6	.667	26	–	12	.684
Florida State	12	–	6	.667	23	–	10	.697
Miami (FL)	11	–	7	.611	22	–	13	.629
No. 20 North Carolina	11	–	7	.611	22	–	11	.667
NC State	9	–	9	.500	20	–	12	.625
Syracuse	9	–	9	.500	20	–	13	.606
Clemson	7	–	11	.389	19	–	16	.543
Boston College	5	–	13	.278	16	–	17	.485
Wake Forest	5	–	13	.278	17	–	17	.500
Virginia	4	–	14	.222	15	–	15	.500
Georgia Tech	4	–	14	.222	13	–	17	.433
Pittsburgh	3	–	15	.167	10	–	20	.333
† 2023 ACC tournament winner As of March 27, 2023; Rankings from AP poll

The 2022–23 Virginia Tech Hokies women's basketball team represented Virginia Polytechnic Institute and State University during the 2022–23 NCAA Division I women's basketball season. The Hokies, were led by seventh-year head coach Kenny Brooks, and played their home games at Cassell Coliseum as members of the Atlantic Coast Conference.

They finished the season 31–5 overall and 14–4 in ACC play to finish in a tie for second place. As the third seed in the ACC tournament, they defeated sixth seed Miami in the Quarterfinals, second seed Duke in the Semifinals and fourth seed Louisville in the Final to win the title. The ACC Tournament title was the first in program history. They received an automatic bid to the NCAA tournament where they were the first seed in the Seattle 3. They defeated sixteenth seed Chattanooga in the First Round, ninth seed South Dakota State in the Second Round, fourth seed Tennessee in the Sweet 16 and third seed Ohio State in the Elite Eight. In the Final Four they could not overcome third seed LSU, losing 79–72 to end their season. The Hokies' trips to the Elite Eight and Final Four were the first such trips in program history.

== Previous season ==
The Hokies finished the season 23–10 overall and 13–5 in ACC play to finish in a three-way tie for third place. As the fifth seed in the ACC tournament, they defeated thirteenth seed Clemson in the Second Round and fourth seed North Carolina in the Quarterfinals before losing to eventual champions and first seed NC State in the Semifinals. They received an at-large bid to the NCAA tournament where they were the fifth seed in the Spokane Region. They lost to twelfth seed Florida Gulf Coast in the First Round to end their season.

== Off-season ==
=== Departures ===
Departures
Name	Number	Pos.	Height	Year	Hometown	Reason for departure
Aisha Sheppard	2	G	5'9"	Graduate Student	Alexandria, Virginia	Graduated; Drafted 23rd overall in the 2022 WNBA draft
Azana Baines	15	G	6'1"	Junior	Blackwood, New Jersey	Transferred to Seton Hall
Shamarla King	21	G	6'0"	(redshirt) Freshman	Hartford, Connecticut	Transferred to Stonybrook
Emily Lytle	24	G/F	5'1'"	Graduate Student	Memphis, Tennessee	Graduated
Rochelle Norris	31	G/F	6'0"	(redshirt) Sophomore	Stafford, Virginia	Transferred to Central Michigan

=== Incoming transfers ===
Incoming transfers
Name	Number	Pos.	Height	Year	Hometown	Previous school
Taylor Soule	13	F	5'11"	Senior	West Lebanon, New Hampshire	Boston College
Ashley Owusu	15	G	6'0"	Senior	Woodbridge, Virginia	Maryland
Clara Ford	32	C	6'3"	Senior	Vienna, Virginia	Boston College

=== Recruiting class ===
College recruiting
Name	Hometown	School	Height	Weight	Commit date
Carleigh Wenzel; G	San Antonio, Texas	Antonian College Prep	6 ft 0 in (1.83 m)	N/A	
Carleigh Wenzel; G	Recruit ratings: ESPN: (94)				
Charlise Dunn; G	Victoria, Australia	Lake Ginninderra	6 ft 2 in (1.88 m)	N/A	
Charlise Dunn; G	Recruit ratings: No ratings found				
Maddie Vejsicky; G	New Concord, Ohio	Newark	6 ft 0 in (1.83 m)	N/A	
Maddie Vejsicky; G	Recruit ratings: No ratings found				
Overall recruit ranking:
Note: In many cases, Scout, Rivals, 247Sports, On3, and ESPN may conflict in their listings of height and weight.; In these cases, the average was taken. ESPN grades are on a 100-point scale.; Sources:

== Roster ==
2022–23 Virginia Tech Hokies women's basketball team
Players
Coaches

Pos.	#	Name	Height	Year	Previous school	Hometown
G	1	Carleigh Wenzel	6 ft 0 in (1.83 m)	Fr	Antonian College Prep	San Antonio, TX
G	3	Chloe Brooks	5 ft 10 in (1.78 m)	RS Sr	Spotswood	Harrisonburg, VA
G	5	Georgia Amoore	5 ft 5 in (1.65 m)	Jr	Loretto College	Ballarat, Australia
G	10	Charlise Dunn	6 ft 2 in (1.88 m)	Fr	Lake Ginninderra	Victoria, Australia
F	11	D'asia Gregg	6 ft 2 in (1.88 m)	Sr	Wilson; Georgia Tech/Gulf Coast State	Florence, SC
F	13	Taylor Soule	5 ft 11 in (1.8 m)	GS	Kimball Union Academy; Boston College	Lebanon, NH
G	14	Maddie Vejsicky	6 ft 0 in (1.83 m)	Fr	Newark	New Concord, OH
G	15	Ashley Owusu	6 ft 0 in (1.83 m)	Jr	Paul VI Catholic HS; Maryland	Woodbridge, VA
G	22	Cayla King	5 ft 11 in (1.8 m)	Sr	Northwest Guilford	Greensboro, NC
G	23	Kayana Traylor	5 ft 9 in (1.75 m)	Sr	Martinsville; Purdue	Martinsville, IN
C	32	Clara Ford	6 ft 3 in (1.91 m)	GS	George C. Marshall; Boston College	Vienna, VA
C	33	Elizabeth Kitley	6 ft 6 in (1.98 m)	Sr	Northwest Guilford	Summerfield, NC
G/F	35	Taylor Geiman	6 ft 0 in (1.83 m)	Sr	South Western	Hanover, PA

Head coach

- Kenny Brooks (James Madison)

Assistant coach(es)

- Lindsey Hicks (Purdue)
- Radvile Autukaite (Reinhardt)

Legend

- (C) Team captain
- (S) Suspended
- (I) Ineligible
- (W) Walk-on
- Injured
- Current redshirt

Roster

== Schedule ==
Date time, TV	Rank^{#}	Opponent^{#}	Result	Record	Site (attendance) city, state
Regular season
November 7, 2022*; 5:00 p.m., ACCNX	No. 13	Mount St. Mary's	W 101–45	1–0	Cassell Coliseum (2,104); Blacksburg, VA
November 11, 2022*; 7:00 p.m., ACCNX	No. 13	Bucknell	W 67–41	2–0	Cassell Coliseum (2,268); Blacksburg, VA
November 14, 2022*; 7:00 p.m., ACCNX	No. 14	USC Upstate	W 79–24	3–0	Cassell Coliseum (1,486); Blacksburg, VA
November 21, 2022*; 12:00 p.m., FloHoops	No. 11	vs. Kentucky; Baha Mar Hoops Pink Flamingo Championship	W 82–74	4–0	Baha Mar Convention Center; Nassau, Bahamas
November 23, 2022*; 1:30 p.m., FloHoops	No. 11	vs. Missouri; Baha Mar Hoops Pink Flamingo Championship	W 73–57	5–0	Baha Mar Convention Center; Nassau, Bahamas
November 27, 2022*; 2:00 p.m., ACCNX	No. 11	Longwood	W 89–28	6–0	Cassell Coliseum (1,913); Blacksburg, VA
December 1, 2022*; 7:00 p.m., ACCN	No. 9	Nebraska; ACC–Big Ten Women's Challenge	W 85–54	7–0	Cassell Coliseum (2,651); Blacksburg, VA
December 4, 2022*; 1:00 p.m., ESPN2	No. 9	at Tennessee; Jimmy V Classic	W 59–56	8–0	Thompson–Boling Arena (8,507); Knoxville, TN
December 7, 2022; 6:00 p.m., ACCN	No. 7	at Boston College	W 73–58	9–0 (1–0)	Conte Forum (1,112); Chestnut Hill, MA
December 11, 2022*; 1:00 p.m., ACCNX	No. 7	UNC Asheville	W 86–48	10–0	Cassell Coliseum (2,027); Blacksburg, VA
December 18, 2022; 4:00 p.m., ACCN	No. 6	No. 5 Notre Dame	L 52–63	10–1 (1–1)	Cassell Coliseum (4,206); Blacksburg, VA
December 21, 2022*; 7:00 p.m., ESPN+	No. 8	at High Point	W 86–66	11–1	Qubein Center (1,378); High Point, NC
December 29, 2022; 6:00 p.m., ACCRSN	No. 7	at Clemson	L 59–64	11–2 (1–2)	Littlejohn Coliseum (1,517); Clemson, SC
January 1, 2023; 4:00 p.m., ACCN	No. 7	No. 13 North Carolina	W 68–65	12–2 (2–2)	Cassell Coliseum (4,186); Blacksburg, VA
January 5, 2023; 7:00 p.m., ACCRSN	No. 9	Virginia; Rivalry	W 74–66	13–2 (3–2)	Cassell Coliseum (2,630); Blacksburg, VA
January 8, 2023; 1:00 p.m., ACCRSN	No. 9	at Miami (FL)	L 66–77	13–3 (3–3)	Watsco Center (1,639); Coral Gables, FL
January 12, 2023; 7:00 p.m., ACCNX	No. 13	Louisville	W 81–79	14–3 (4–3)	Cassell Coliseum (2,328); Blacksburg, VA
January 19, 2023; 6:00 p.m., ACCNX	No. 12	at Pittsburgh	W 69–62	15–3 (5–3)	Petersen Events Center (356); Pittsburgh, PA
January 22, 2023; 1:00 p.m., ACCRSN	No. 12	Wake Forest	W 74–57	16–3 (6–3)	Cassell Coliseum (3,209); Blacksburg, VA
January 26, 2023; 8:00 p.m., ACCN	No. 12	at No. 16 Duke	L 55–66	16–4 (6–4)	Cameron Indoor Stadium (2,207); Durham, NC
January 29, 2023; 6:00 p.m., ACCN	No. 12	at Virginia; Rivalry	W 72–60	17–4 (7–4)	John Paul Jones Arena (5,103); Charlottesville, VA
February 2, 2023; 7:00 p.m., ACCNX	No. 13	Syracuse	W 78–64	18–4 (8–4)	Cassell Coliseum (2,592); Blacksburg, VA
February 6, 2023; 6:00 p.m., ESPN2	No. 11	at No. 22 NC State; Play4Kay	W 73–61	19–4 (9–4)	Reynolds Coliseum (5,500); Raleigh, NC
February 12, 2023; 2:00 p.m., ACCN	No. 11	No. 19 Florida State	W 84–70	20–4 (10–4)	Cassell Coliseum (2,897); Blacksburg, VA
February 16, 2023; 7:00 p.m., ACCNX	No. 11	No. 9 Duke	W 61–45	21–4 (11–4)	Cassell Coliseum (3,084); Blacksburg, VA
February 19, 2023; 4:00 p.m., ESPN2	No. 11	NC State	W 75–62	22–4 (12–4)	Cassell Coliseum (6,413); Blacksburg, VA
February 23, 2023; 8:00 p.m., ACCRSN	No. 9	at No. 22 North Carolina	W 61–59	23–4 (13–4)	Carmichael Arena (2,908); Chapel Hill, NC
February 26, 2023; 4:00 p.m., ACCN	No. 9	at Georgia Tech	W 65–52	24–4 (14–4)	McCamish Pavilion (2,014); Atlanta, GA
ACC Women's Tournament
March 3, 2023; 8:00 p.m., ACCN	(3) No. 8	vs. (6) Miami (FL); Quarterfinals	W 68–42	25–4	Greensboro Coliseum (7,823); Greensboro, NC
March 4, 2023; 2:30 p.m., ACCN	(3) No. 8	vs. (2) No. 13 Duke; Semifinals	W 58–37	26–4	Greensboro Coliseum (7,122); Greensboro, NC
March 5, 2023; 12:00 p.m., ESPN	(3) No. 8	vs. (4) Louisville; Championship	W 75–67	27–4	Greensboro Coliseum (6,802); Greensboro, NC
NCAA Women's Tournament
March 17, 2023*; 5:30 p.m., ESPNU	(1 S3) No. 4	(16 S3) Chattanooga; First Round	W 58–33	28–4	Cassell Coliseum (8,925); Blacksburg, VA
March 19, 2023*; 5:00 p.m., ESPN2	(1 S3) No. 4	(9 S3) South Dakota State; Second Round	W 72–60	29–4	Cassell Coliseum (8,925); Blacksburg, VA
March 25, 2023*; 6:30 p.m., ESPN2	(1 S3) No. 4	vs. (4 S3) No. 24 Tennessee; Sweet Sixteen	W 73–64	30–4	Climate Pledge Arena (10,839); Seattle, WA
March 27, 2023*; 9:00 p.m., ESPN	(1 S3) No. 4	vs. (3 S3) No. 12 Ohio State; Elite Eight	W 84–74	31–4	Climate Pledge Arena (8,466); Seattle, WA
March 31, 2023*; 7:00 p.m., ESPN	(1 S3) No. 4	vs. (3 G2) No. 9 LSU; Final Four	L 72–79	31–5	American Airlines Center (19,288); Dallas, TX
*Non-conference game. ^{#}Rankings from AP Poll. (#) Tournament seedings in parentheses. S3=Seattle 3 G2=Greenville 2. All times are in Eastern.

== Rankings ==
Regular season polls
Poll	Pre- Season	Week 2	Week 3	Week 4	Week 5	Week 6	Week 7	Week 8	Week 9	Week 10	Week 11	Week 12	Week 13	Week 14	Week 15	Week 16	Week 17	Week 18	Week 19	Final
AP	13	14	11	9	7	6	8	7	9	13	12	12	13	11	11	9	8	4	4	N/A
Coaches	13	14	9	9	7	6	8	7	10	13	10	10	11	9	9	9	8	6	5	4

Note: The AP does not release a final poll.

Legend
	Increase in ranking
	Decrease in ranking
	Not ranked in previous week
(RV)	Received Votes
(NR)	Not Ranked

== See also ==
- 2022–23 Virginia Tech Hokies men's basketball team
