= 2022–23 Louisville Cardinals women's basketball team =

Intercollegiate basketball season

2022–23 Louisville Cardinals women's basketball

NCAA tournament, Elite Eight
- Conference: Atlantic Coast Conference

Ranking
- Coaches: No. 14
- Record: 26–12 (12–6 ACC)
- Head coach: Jeff Walz (16th season)
- Assistant coaches: Stephanie Norman; Jonneshia Pineda; Shay Robinson
- Home arena: KFC Yum! Center

2022–23 ACC women's basketball standings
| | Conf. | | | | Overall |
| Team | W | | L | PCT | W | | L | PCT |
|---|---|---|---|---|---|---|---|---|
| No. 10т Notre Dame | 15 | – | 3 | .833 | 27 | – | 6 | .818 |
| No. 13 Duke | 14 | – | 4 | .778 | 26 | – | 7 | .788 |
| No. 4 Virginia Tech † | 14 | – | 4 | .778 | 31 | – | 4 | .886 |
| Louisville | 12 | – | 6 | .667 | 26 | – | 12 | .684 |
| Florida State | 12 | – | 6 | .667 | 23 | – | 10 | .697 |
| Miami (FL) | 11 | – | 7 | .611 | 22 | – | 13 | .629 |
| No. 20 North Carolina | 11 | – | 7 | .611 | 22 | – | 11 | .667 |
| NC State | 9 | – | 9 | .500 | 20 | – | 12 | .625 |
| Syracuse | 9 | – | 9 | .500 | 20 | – | 13 | .606 |
| Clemson | 7 | – | 11 | .389 | 19 | – | 16 | .543 |
| Boston College | 5 | – | 13 | .278 | 16 | – | 17 | .485 |
| Wake Forest | 5 | – | 13 | .278 | 17 | – | 17 | .500 |
| Virginia | 4 | – | 14 | .222 | 15 | – | 15 | .500 |
| Georgia Tech | 4 | – | 14 | .222 | 13 | – | 17 | .433 |
| Pittsburgh | 3 | – | 15 | .167 | 10 | – | 20 | .333 |
† 2023 ACC tournament winner As of March 27, 2023; Rankings from AP poll

The 2022–23 Louisville Cardinals women's basketball team represented the University of Louisville during the 2022–23 NCAA Division I women's basketball season. The Cardinals, were led by 16th-year head coach Jeff Walz, and played their home games at the KFC Yum! Center. This season was their ninth year competing in the Atlantic Coast Conference.

They finished the season 26–12 overall and 12–6 in ACC play to finish in a tie for fourth place. As the fourth seed in the ACC tournament, they earned a bye to the quarterfinals, where they defeated twelfth seed Wake Forest. They defeated first seed Notre Dame in the semifinals before falling short in the final to third seed Virginia Tech. They received an at-large bid to the NCAA tournament and were the fifth seed in the Seattle 4 Regional. They defeated twelfth seed Drake in the first round, fourth seed Texas in the second round, and eighth seed Ole Miss in the Sweet Sixteen, before losing to second seed Iowa in the Elite Eight to end their season.

== Previous season ==
The Cardinals finished the season 29–5 overall and 16–2 in ACC play to finish in second place. As the second seed in the ACC tournament, they were upset by seventh seed Miami in the quarterfinals. They received an at-large bid to the NCAA tournament and were the first seed in the Wichita Regional. They defeated sixteenth seed Albany in the first round, ninth seed Gonzaga in the second round, fourth seed Tennessee in the Sweet Sixteen, and third seed Michigan in the Elite Eight before falling to eventual champions, and first seed South Carolina in the Final Four. This was the Cardinals' fourth appearance in the Final Four in program history.

== Off-season ==
=== Departures ===
Departures
| Name | Number | Pos. | Height | Year | Hometown | Reason for departure |
|---|---|---|---|---|---|---|
| Ramani Parker | 0 | F | 6'4" | (redshirt) Sophomore | Fresno, California | Transferred to Mississippi State |
| Ahlana Smith | 2 | G | 5'9" | Senior | Charlotte, North Carolina | Graduated; transferred to Mississippi State |
| Kianna Smith | 14 | G | 6'0" | (redshirt) Senior | Moreno Valley, California | Graduated; drafted 16th overall in the 2022 WNBA draft |
| Emily Engstler | 21 | F | 6'1" | Senior | New York City, New York | Graduated; drafted 4th overall in the 2022 WNBA draft |
| Chelsie Hall | 23 | G | 5'7" | Graduate student | Boca Raton, Florida | Graduated |
| Sydni Schetnan | 45 | F | 6'5" | Freshman | Sioux Falls, South Dakota | None reported |

=== Incoming transfers ===
Incoming transfers
| Name | Number | Pos. | Height | Year | Hometown | Previous school |
|---|---|---|---|---|---|---|
| Chrislyn Carr | 3 | G | 5'5" | Graduate student | Davenport, Iowa | Syracuse |
| Morgan Jones | 24 | G | 6'2" | Graduate student | Jonesboro, Georgia | Florida State |
| Josie Williams | 40 | C | 6'5" | Graduate student | West Haven, Utah | Utah Valley |

=== Recruiting class ===
College recruiting
| Name | Hometown | School | Height | Weight | Commit date |
|---|---|---|---|---|---|
| Nyla Harris; F | Windermere, Florida | Lake Highland Preparatory School | 6 ft 2 in (1.88 m) | N/A | |
| Nyla Harris; F | Recruit ratings: ESPN: (95) | | | | |
| Zyanna Walker; G | Wichita, Kansas | Wichita Heights High School | 6 ft 0 in (1.83 m) | N/A | |
| Zyanna Walker; G | Recruit ratings: ESPN: (95) | | | | |
| Imani Lester; F | Raleigh, North Carolina | North Raleigh Christian Academy | 6 ft 3 in (1.91 m) | N/A | |
| Imani Lester; F | Recruit ratings: ESPN: (94) | | | | |
| Jalyn Brown; G | Baltimore, Maryland | Saint Frances Academy | 6 ft 0 in (1.83 m) | N/A | |
| Jalyn Brown; G | Recruit ratings: ESPN: (92) | | | | |
| Alexia Mobley; G | Reynoldsburg, Ohio | Reynoldsburg High School | 6 ft 2 in (1.88 m) | N/A | |
| Alexia Mobley; G | Recruit ratings: ESPN: (90) | | | | |
Overall recruit ranking:
Note: In many cases, Scout, Rivals, 247Sports, On3, and ESPN may conflict in their listings of height and weight.; In these cases, the average was taken. ESPN grades are on a 100-point scale.; Sources:

== Roster ==
2022–23 Louisville Cardinals women's basketball team
Players
Coaches

| Pos. | # | Name | Height | Year | Previous school | Hometown |
|---|---|---|---|---|---|---|
| G | 1 | Zyanna Walker | 5 ft 8 in (1.73 m) | Fr | Wichita Heights | Wichita, KS |
| G | 2 | Nyla Harris | 6 ft 2 in (1.88 m) | Fr | Lake Highland Prep | Winermere, FL |
| G | 3 | Chrislyn Carr | 5 ft 5 in (1.65 m) | GS | Rock Island; Syracuse | Davenport, IA |
| G | 5 | Mykasa Robinson | 5 ft 7 in (1.7 m) | GS | Ashland Blazer | Ashland, KY |
| G | 10 | Hailey Van Lith | 5 ft 7 in (1.7 m) | Jr | Cashmere | Wenatchee, WA |
| G | 11 | Norika Konno | 5 ft 10 in (1.78 m) | Sr | Seiwa Gakuen | Sendai, Japan |
| G | 12 | Payton Verhulst | 6 ft 1 in (1.85 m) | So | Bishop Miege | De Soto, KS |
| G | 13 | Merissah Russell | 5 ft 11 in (1.8 m) | Jr | Cairine Wilson | Ottawa, Ontario |
| G | 15 | Jalyn Brown | 6 ft 0 in (1.83 m) | Fr | Saint Frances Academy | Baltimore, MD |
| F | 22 | Elizabeth Dixon | 6 ft 5 in (1.96 m) | GS | Ridgeway; Georgia Tech | Memphis, TN |
| F | 23 | Alexia Mobley | 6 ft 2 in (1.88 m) | RS Fr | Reynoldsburg | Reynoldsburgh, OH |
| G | 24 | Morgan Jones | 6 ft 2 in (1.88 m) | GS | Our Lady of Mercy; Florida State | Jonesboro, GA |
| F | 32 | Imani Lester | 6 ft 3 in (1.91 m) | Fr | North Raleigh Christian | Raleigh, NC |
| C | 40 | Josie Williams | 6 ft 5 in (1.96 m) | GS | Roy; Utah Valley | West Haven, UT |
| F | 44 | Olivia Cochran | 6 ft 3 in (1.91 m) | Jr | Carver | Columbus, GA |

Head coach

- Jeff Walz (Northern Kentucky)

Assistant coach(es)

- Stephanie Norman (Arizona State)
- Jonneshia Pineda (Georgia Southwestern State)
- Shay Robinson (Central Florida)

Legend

- (C) Team captain
- (S) Suspended
- (I) Ineligible
- (W) Walk-on
- Injured
- Current redshirt

Roster
Last update: October 18, 2022

== Schedule and results ==
| Date time, TV | Rank^{#} | Opponent^{#} | Result | Record | Site (attendance) city, state |
Non-conference regular season
| November 7, 2022*; 5:00 p.m., ACCN | No. 7 | Cincinnati | W 87–68 | 1–0 | KFC Yum! Center (8,049); Louisville, KY |
| November 10, 2022*; 7:00 p.m., ACCNX | No. 7 | IUPUI | W 84–62 | 2–0 | KFC Yum! Center (7,436); Louisville, KY |
| November 13, 2022*; 5:00 p.m., ESPN+ | No. 7 | at Belmont | W 75–70 | 3–0 | Curb Event Center (1,840); Nashville, TN |
| November 19, 2022*; 7:30 p.m., FloHoops | No. 6 | vs. Gonzaga; Battle 4 Atlantis quarterfinals | L 67–79 ^{OT} | 3–1 | Atlantis Paradise Island (421); Paradise Island, Bahamas |
| November 20, 2022*; 7:30 p.m., FloHoops | No. 6 | vs. No. 3 Texas; Battle 4 Atlantis consolation round | W 71–63 | 4–1 | Atlantis Paradise Island (365); Paradise Island, Bahamas |
| November 21, 2022*; 5:00 p.m., FloHoops | No. 10 | vs. South Dakota State; Battle 4 Atlantis 5th place | L 55–65 | 4–2 | Atlantis Paradise Island (215); Paradise Island, Bahamas |
| November 25, 2022*; 12:00 p.m., ACCNX | No. 10 | Longwood | W 100–37 | 5–2 | KFC Yum! Center (8,130); Louisville, KY |
| November 30, 2022*; 7:30 p.m., ACCN | No. 18 | No. 4 Ohio State; ACC–Big Ten Women's Challenge | L 77–96 | 5–3 | KFC Yum! Center (8,259); Louisville, KY |
| December 4, 2022*; 5:00 p.m., ESPN+ | No. 18 | at Middle Tennessee | L 49–67 | 5–4 | Murphy Center (5,307); Murfreesboro, TN |
| December 6, 2022*; 7:00 p.m., ACCNX | | SIU Edwardsville | W 105–32 | 6–4 | KFC Yum! Center (7,311); Louisville, KY |
| December 11, 2022*; 1:00 p.m., ESPN | | at Kentucky; Rivalry | W 86–72 | 7–4 | Rupp Arena (7,927); Lexington, KY |
| December 14, 2022*; 6:30 p.m., ESPN+ | | at Bellarmine | W 73–43 | 8–4 | Freedom Hall (2,676); Louisville, KY |
| December 18, 2022; 2:00 p.m., ACCN | | at Pittsburgh | W 77–53 | 9–4 (1–0) | Peterson Events Center (491); Pittsburgh, PA |
| December 21, 2022*; 8:30 p.m., FS1 | | at DePaul | W 81–67 | 10–4 | Sullivan Athletic Center (1,422); Chicago, IL |
| December 29, 2022; 7:00 p.m., ACCNX | | Syracuse | W 86–77 | 11–4 (2–0) | KFC Yum! Center (9,025); Louisville, KY |
| January 1, 2023; 12:00 p.m., ACCRSN | | at Duke | L 56–63 | 11–5 (2–1) | Cameron Indoor Stadium (1,720); Durham, NC |
| January 5, 2023; 8:00 p.m., ACCN | | Georgia Tech | W 63–55 | 12–5 (3–1) | KFC Yum! Center (7,633); Louisville, KY |
| January 8, 2023; 2:00 p.m., ACCN | | Pittsburgh | W 76–69 | 13–5 (4–1) | KFC Yum! Center (9,218); Louisville, KY |
| January 12, 2023; 7:00 p.m., ACCNX | | at No. 13 Virginia Tech | L 79–81 | 13–6 (4–2) | Cassell Coliseum (2,328); Blacksburg, VA |
| January 15, 2023; 1:00 p.m., ACCRSN | | at Florida State | W 82–75 | 14–6 (5–2) | Donald L. Tucker Center (2,544); Tallahassee, FL |
| January 19, 2023; 7:00 p.m., ACCNX | | Boston College | W 72–65 | 15–6 (6–2) | KFC Yum! Center (7,592); Louisville, KY |
| January 22, 2023; 1:00 p.m., ABC | | No. 20 NC State | L 51–63 | 15–7 (6–3) | KFC Yum! Center (11,175); Louisville, KY |
| January 26, 2023; 6:00 p.m., ACCN | | at Wake Forest | L 57–68 | 15–8 (6–4) | LJVM Coliseum (857); Winston–Salem, NC |
| January 29, 2023; 12:00 p.m., ACCN | | at Syracuse | W 79–67 | 16–8 (7–4) | JMA Wireless Dome (6,220); Syracuse, NY |
| February 5, 2023; 12:00 p.m., ESPN2 | | No. 11 North Carolina | W 62–55 | 17–8 (8–4) | KFC Yum! Center (10,069); Louisville, KY |
| February 9, 2023; 7:00 p.m., ACCNX | | Virginia | W 63–53 | 18–8 (9–4) | John Paul Jones Arena (3,008); Charlottesville, VA |
| February 12, 2023; 6:00 p.m., ACCN | | Clemson | W 81–69 | 19–8 (10–4) | KFC Yum! Center (8,782); Louisville, KY |
| February 16, 2023; 7:00 p.m., ESPN | | at No. 10 Notre Dame | L 76–78 ^{OT} | 19–9 (10–5) | Purcell Pavilion (5,245); Notre Dame, IN |
| February 19, 2023; 12:00 p.m., ACCN | | at Boston College | W 62–52 | 20–9 (11–5) | Conte Forum (1,423); Chestnut Hill, MA |
| February 23, 2023; 6:00 p.m., ACCN | | Miami (FL) | W 71–57 | 21–9 (12–5) | KFC Yum! Center (8,211); Louisville, KY |
| February 26, 2023; 12:00 p.m., ESPN | | No. 10 Notre Dame | L 65–68 | 21–10 (12–6) | KFC Yum! Center (12,015); Louisville, KY |
ACC Women's Tournament
| March 3, 2023; 11:00 a.m., ACCN | (4) | vs. (12) Wake Forest; Quarterfinals | W 74–48 | 22–10 | Greensboro Coliseum (6,151); Greensboro, NC |
| March 4, 2023; 12:00 p.m., ACCN | (4) | vs. (1) No. 10 Notre Dame; Semifinals | W 64–38 | 23–10 | Greensboro Coliseum (7,122); Greensboro, NC |
| March 5, 2023; 12:00 p.m., ESPN | (4) | vs. (3) No. 8 Virginia Tech; Finals | L 67–75 | 23–11 | Greensboro Coliseum (6,802); Greensboro, NC |
NCAA Women's Tournament
| March 18, 2023*; 7:30 p.m., ESPN2 | (5 S4) | vs. (12 S4) Drake; First round | W 83–81 | 24–11 | Moody Center; Austin, TX |
| March 20, 2023*; 7:00 p.m., ESPN | (5 S4) | at (4 S4) No. 15 Texas; Second round | W 73–51 | 25–11 | Moody Center (5,430); Austin, TX |
| March 24, 2023*; 10:00 p.m., ESPN | (5 S4) | vs. (8 S4) Ole Miss; Sweet Sixteen | W 72–62 | 26–11 | Climate Pledge Arena (9,626); Seattle, WA |
| March 26, 2023*; 9:00 p.m., ESPN | (5 S4) | vs. (2 S4) No. 3 Iowa; Elite Eight | L 83–97 | 26–12 | Climate Pledge Arena (11,700); Seattle, WA |
*Non-conference game. ^{#}Rankings from AP Poll. (#) Tournament seedings in parentheses. S4=Seattle 4. All times are in Eastern.

== Rankings ==
Regular season polls
| Poll | Pre- season | Week 2 | Week 3 | Week 4 | Week 5 | Week 6 | Week 7 | Week 8 | Week 9 | Week 10 | Week 11 | Week 12 | Week 13 | Week 14 | Week 15 | Week 16 | Week 17 | Week 18 | Week 19 | Final |
|---|---|---|---|---|---|---|---|---|---|---|---|---|---|---|---|---|---|---|---|---|
| AP | 7 | 6 | 10 | 18 | RV | RV | RV | RV | | RV | RV | | | RV | RV | RV | RV | RV | RV | N/A |
| Coaches | 5 | 4 | 12 | 15 | 24 | 25 | RV | RV | RV | RV | RV | RV | | | RV | RV | RV | RV | RV | 14 |

Note: The AP does not release a final poll.

Legend
| | Increase in ranking |
| | Decrease in ranking |
| | Not ranked previous week |
| (RV) | Received votes |
