= 2022–23 NC State Wolfpack women's basketball team =

Intercollegiate basketball season

2022–23 NC State Wolfpack women's basketball

NCAA tournament, First Round
- Conference: Atlantic Coast Conference
- Record: 20–12 (9–9 ACC)
- Head coach: Wes Moore (10th season)
- Assistant coaches: Nikki West; Brittany Morris; Ashley Williams
- Home arena: Reynolds Coliseum

2022–23 ACC women's basketball standings
| | Conf. | | | | Overall |
| Team | W | | L | PCT | W | | L | PCT |
|---|---|---|---|---|---|---|---|---|
| No. 10т Notre Dame | 15 | – | 3 | .833 | 27 | – | 6 | .818 |
| No. 13 Duke | 14 | – | 4 | .778 | 26 | – | 7 | .788 |
| No. 4 Virginia Tech † | 14 | – | 4 | .778 | 31 | – | 4 | .886 |
| Louisville | 12 | – | 6 | .667 | 26 | – | 12 | .684 |
| Florida State | 12 | – | 6 | .667 | 23 | – | 10 | .697 |
| Miami (FL) | 11 | – | 7 | .611 | 22 | – | 13 | .629 |
| No. 20 North Carolina | 11 | – | 7 | .611 | 22 | – | 11 | .667 |
| NC State | 9 | – | 9 | .500 | 20 | – | 12 | .625 |
| Syracuse | 9 | – | 9 | .500 | 20 | – | 13 | .606 |
| Clemson | 7 | – | 11 | .389 | 19 | – | 16 | .543 |
| Boston College | 5 | – | 13 | .278 | 16 | – | 17 | .485 |
| Wake Forest | 5 | – | 13 | .278 | 17 | – | 17 | .500 |
| Virginia | 4 | – | 14 | .222 | 15 | – | 15 | .500 |
| Georgia Tech | 4 | – | 14 | .222 | 13 | – | 17 | .433 |
| Pittsburgh | 3 | – | 15 | .167 | 10 | – | 20 | .333 |
† 2023 ACC tournament winner As of March 27, 2023; Rankings from AP poll

The 2022–23 NC State Wolfpack women's basketball team represented North Carolina State University during the 2022–23 NCAA Division I women's basketball season. The Wolfpack were led by tenth-year head coach Wes Moore and played their home games at Reynolds Coliseum as members of the Atlantic Coast Conference.

The Wolfpack finished the season 20–12 overall and 9–9 in ACC play to finish in a tie for eighth place. As the eighth seed in the ACC tournament, they earned a bye to the Second round where they defeated ninth seed Syracuse, then lost to first seed Notre Dame in the Quarterfinals. They earned an at-large bid to the NCAA tournament where they were the seventh seed in the Greenville 2 Region. They were upset by ten-seed Princeton in the First round to end their season.

== Previous season ==
The Wolfpack finished the season 32–4 overall and 17–1 in ACC play to finish as regular season champions. As the first seed in the ACC tournament, they earned a bye to the Quarterfinals where they defeated ninth seed Florida State, then they defeated fifth seed Virginia Tech in the Semifinals, and they won the Final versus seven seed Miami to win their third straight tournament title. As champions, they earned the ACC's automatic bid to the NCAA tournament where they were the first seed in the Bridgeport Region. They defeated sixteen seed Longwood in the First Round, ninth seed Kansas State in the Second Round, and fifth seed Notre Dame in the Sweet Sixteen before losing to second seed UConn in the Elite Eight to end their season.

== Off-season ==
=== Departures ===
Departures
| Name | Number | Pos. | Height | Year | Hometown | Reason for departure |
|---|---|---|---|---|---|---|
| Genesis Bryant | 1 | G | 5'6" | Sophomore | Jonesboro, Georgia | Transferred to Illinois |
| Raina Perez | 2 | G | 5'4" | Graduate Student | Goodyear, Arizona | Graduated |
| Kai Crutchfield | 3 | G | 5'9" | Graduate Student | Raleigh, North Carolina | Graduated |
| Kendal Moore | 15 | G | 5'6" | Junior | Fayetteville, North Carolina | Entered Transfer Portal |
| Kayla Jones | 25 | F | 6'1" | Graduate Student | Jamesville, North Carolina | Graduated; Selected 22nd overall in the 2022 WNBA draft |
| Elissa Cunane | 33 | C | 6'5" | Senior | Summerfield, North Carolina | Graduated; Selected 17th overall in the 2022 WNBA draft |

=== Incoming transfers ===
Incoming transfers
| Name | Number | Pos. | Height | Year | Hometown | Previous school |
|---|---|---|---|---|---|---|
| River Baldwin | 1 | C | 6'5" | Graduate Student | Andalusia, Alabama | Florida State |
| Mimi Collins | 2 | F | 6'3" | Graduate Student | Waldorf, Maryland | Maryland |
| Saniya Rivers | 22 | G | 6'1" | Sophomore | Wilmington, North Carolina | South Carolina |

=== Recruiting class ===
NC State did not have any Freshman join the team in the 2022–23 season.

== Roster ==
2022–23 NC State Wolfpack women's basketball team
Players
Coaches

| Pos. | # | Name | Height | Year | Previous school | Hometown |
|---|---|---|---|---|---|---|
| C | 1 | River Baldwin | 6 ft 5 in (1.96 m) | GS | Pleasant Home; Florida State | Andalusia, AL |
| F | 2 | Mimi Collins | 6 ft 3 in (1.91 m) | GS | Paul VI Catholic HS; Maryland | Waldorf, MD |
| G | 3 | Diamond Johnson | 5 ft 5 in (1.65 m) | Jr | Neumann Goretti; Rutgers | Philadelphia, PA |
| F | 5 | Jada Boyd | 6 ft 2 in (1.88 m) | Sr | Appomattox County | Petersburg, VA |
| G | 10 | Aziaha James | 5 ft 9 in (1.75 m) | So | Princess Anne | Virginia Beach, VA |
| G | 11 | Jakia Brown-Turner | 6 ft 0 in (1.83 m) | Sr | Bishop McNamara | Temple Hills, MD |
| G | 21 | Madison Hayes | 6 ft 0 in (1.83 m) | Jr | East Hamilton; Mississippi State | Chattanooga, TN |
| G | 22 | Saniya Rivers | 6 ft 1 in (1.85 m) | So | Eugene Ashley; South Carolina | Wilmington, NC |
| G | 23 | Jessica Timmons | 5 ft 8 in (1.73 m) | Fr | North Mecklenburg | Charlotte, NC |
| C | 32 | Sophie Hart | 6 ft 5 in (1.96 m) | So | Farmington | Farmington, MN |
| C | 41 | Camille Hobby | 6 ft 3 in (1.91 m) | Sr | Nease | Jacksonville, FL |

Head coach

- Wes Moore (Johnson)

Assistant coach(es)

- Kikki West (Clemson)
- Brittany Moris (Seton Hall)
- Ashley Williams (NC State)

Legend

- (C) Team captain
- (S) Suspended
- (I) Ineligible
- (W) Walk-on
- Injured
- Current redshirt

Roster
Last update: October 28, 2022

== Schedule ==
| Date time, TV | Rank^{#} | Opponent^{#} | Result | Record | Site (attendance) city, state |
Exhibition
| November 3, 2022*; 7:00 p.m. | No. 10 | UNC Pembroke | W 81–22 | – | Reynolds Coliseum; Raleigh, NC |
Non-conference regular season
| November 7, 2022*; 5:00 p.m., ACCNX | No. 10 | Quinnipiac | W 82–45 | 1–0 | Reynolds Coliseum (4,264); Raleigh, NC |
| November 10, 2022*; 7:00 p.m., ACCNX | No. 10 | Elon | W 89–55 | 2–0 | Reynolds Coliseum (4,083); Raleigh, NC |
| November 13, 2022*; 2:00 p.m., ACCNX | No. 10 | Mount St. Mary's | W 86–38 | 3–0 | Reynolds Coliseum (4,373); Raleigh, NC |
| November 16, 2022*; 7:00 p.m., ACCNX | No. 10 | Charlotte | W 96–48 | 4–0 | Reynolds Coliseum (4,428); Raleigh, NC |
| November 20, 2022*; 1:00 p.m., FS1 | No. 10 | at No. 5 Connecticut | L 69–91 | 4–1 | Harry A. Gampel Pavilion (10,359); Storrs, CT |
| November 24, 2022*; 4:00 p.m., FloHoops | No. 13 | vs. Vanderbilt; Cancún Challenge | W 82–73 | 5–1 | Hard Rock Hotel Riviera Maya (161); Cancún, Mexico |
| November 25, 2022*; 4:00 p.m., FloHoops | No. 13 | vs. West Virginia; Cancún Challenge | W 78–40 | 6–1 | Hard Rock Hotel Riviera Maya (107); Cancún, Mexico |
| December 1, 2022*; 8:30 p.m., ESPN2 | No. 12 | at No. 10 Iowa; ACC–Big Ten Women's Challenge | W 94–81 | 7–1 | Carver–Hawkeye Arena (8,250); Iowa City, IA |
| December 5, 2022*; 8:00 p.m., SECN | No. 8 | at Georgia | W 65–54 | 8–1 | Stegeman Coliseum (2,048); Athens, GA |
| December 11, 2022*; 2:00 p.m., ACCN | No. 8 | South Florida | W 65–57 | 9–1 | Reynolds Coliseum (5,269); Raleigh, NC |
| December 15, 2022*; 8:00 p.m., ACCN | No. 8 | Davidson | W 81–47 | 10–1 | Reynolds Coliseum (4,023); Raleigh, NC |
ACC regular season
| December 18, 2022; 6:00 p.m., ACCN | No. 8 | Clemson | W 77–59 | 11–1 (1–0) | Reynolds Coliseum (5,500); Raleigh, NC |
| December 29, 2022; 8:00 p.m., ACCN | No. 6 | Duke | L 58–72 | 11–2 (1–1) | Reynolds Coliseum (5,500); Raleigh, NC |
| January 1, 2023; 7:00 p.m., ACCRSN | No. 6 | at Syracuse | W 56–54 | 12–2 (2–1) | Carrier Dome (1,994); Syracuse, NY |
| January 5, 2023; 7:00 p.m., ACCNX | No. 10 | Boston College | L 71–79 | 12–3 (2–2) | Reynolds Coliseum (5,145); Raleigh, NC |
| January 8, 2023; 7:00 p.m., ACCRSN | No. 10 | Virginia | W 87–62 | 13–3 (3–2) | Reynolds Coliseum (5,500); Raleigh, NC |
| January 12, 2023; 6:00 p.m., ACCN | No. 11 | at Florida State | L 72–91 | 13–4 (3–3) | Donald L. Tucker Center (2,014); Tallahassee, FL |
| January 15, 2023; 3:30 p.m., ESPN | No. 11 | at No. 22 North Carolina; Rivalry | L 47–56 | 13–5 (3–4) | Carmichael Arena (6,319); Chapel Hill, NC |
| January 19, 2023; 6:00 p.m., ACCN | No. 20 | Miami (FL) | W 71–61 | 14–5 (4–4) | Reynolds Coliseum (5,500); Raleigh, NC |
| January 22, 2023; 1:00 p.m., ABC | No. 20 | at Louisville | W 63–51 | 15–5 (5–4) | KFC Yum! Center (11,175); Louisville, KY |
| January 29, 2023; 3:00 p.m., ESPN | No. 20 | No. 7 Notre Dame | W 69–65 | 16–5 (6–4) | Reynolds Coliseum (5,500); Raleigh, NC |
| February 2, 2023; 8:00 p.m., ACCN | No. 15 | at Georgia Tech | L 62–68 | 16–6 (6–5) | McCamish Pavilion (1,653); Atlanta, GA |
| February 6, 2023; 6:00 p.m., ESPN2 | No. 22 | No. 11 Virginia Tech; Play4Kay | L 61–73 | 16–7 (6–6) | Reynolds Coliseum (5,500); Raleigh, NC |
| February 9, 2023; 8:00 p.m., ACCN | No. 22 | at Wake Forest | W 51–42 | 17–7 (7–6) | LJVM Coliseum (957); Winston-Salem, NC |
| February 12, 2023; 12:00 p.m., ACCRSN | No. 22 | at Virginia | L 59–71 | 17–8 (7–7) | John Paul Jones Arena (3,700); Charlottesville, VA |
| February 16, 2023; 8:00 p.m., ACCN | | No. 19 North Carolina | W 77–66 ^{OT} | 18–8 (8–7) | Reynolds Coliseum (5,500); Raleigh, NC |
| February 19, 2023; 4:00 p.m., ESPN2 | | at No. 11 Virginia Tech | L 62–75 | 18–9 (8–8) | Cassell Coliseum (6,413); Blacksburg, VA |
| February 23, 2023; 8:00 p.m., ACCN | | at No. 11 Duke | L 62–77 | 18–10 (8–9) | Cameron Indoor Stadium (3,139); Durham, NC |
| February 26, 2023; 2:00 p.m., ACCNX | | Pittsburgh | W 68–63 | 19–10 (9–9) | Reynolds Coliseum (5,500); Raleigh, NC |
ACC tournament
| March 2, 2023; 2:00 p.m., ACCN | (8) | vs. (9) Syracuse; Second round | W 83–58 | 20–10 | Greensboro Coliseum (4,177); Greensboro, NC |
| March 3, 2023; 2:00 p.m., ACCN | (8) | vs. (1) No. 10 Notre Dame; Quarterfinals | L 60–66 | 20–11 | Greensboro Coliseum (6,151); Greensboro, NC |
NCAA tournament
| March 17, 2023*; 10:00 p.m., ESPN2 | (7 G2) | vs. (10 G2) Princeton; First round | L 63–64 | 20–12 | Jon M. Huntsman Center (7,130); Salt Lake City, UT |
*Non-conference game. ^{#}Rankings from AP Poll. (#) Tournament seedings in parentheses. G2=Greenville 2. All times are in Eastern.

== Rankings ==
Regular season polls
| Poll | Pre- Season | Week 2 | Week 3 | Week 4 | Week 5 | Week 6 | Week 7 | Week 8 | Week 9 | Week 10 | Week 11 | Week 12 | Week 13 | Week 14 | Week 15 | Week 16 | Week 17 | Week 18 | Week 19 | Final |
|---|---|---|---|---|---|---|---|---|---|---|---|---|---|---|---|---|---|---|---|---|
| AP | 10 | 10 | 13 | 12 | 8т | 8 | 7 | 6 | 10 | 11 | 20 | 20 | 15 | 22 | RV | RV | RV | RV | RV | N/A |
| Coaches | 8 | 7 | 11 | 11 | 10 | 8 | 6 | 6 | 9 | 12 | 18 | 18 | 13 | 20 | 24 | RV | RV | RV | RV | RV |

Note: The AP does not release a final poll.

Legend
| | Increase in ranking |
| | Decrease in ranking |
| | Not ranked in previous week |
| (RV) | Received Votes |
| (NR) | Not Ranked |
