= 2022–23 Texas Longhorns women's basketball team =

Intercollegiate basketball season

2022–23 Texas Longhorns women's basketball

Big 12 regular season co-champions

NCAA tournament, Round of 32
- Conference: Big 12 Conference

Ranking
- Coaches: No. 19
- AP: No. 15
- Record: 26–10 (14–4 Big 12)
- Head coach: Vic Schaefer (3rd season)
- Associate head coach: Elena Lovato (1st season)
- Assistant coaches: Lindsay Wisdom-Hylton (1st season); Blair Schaefer (3rd season)
- Home arena: Moody Center

2022–23 Big 12 Conference women's basketball standings
	Conf.				Overall
Team	W		L	PCT	W		L	PCT
No. 15 Texas	14	–	4	.778	26	–	10	.722
No. 16 Oklahoma	14	–	4	.778	26	–	7	.788
No. 17 Iowa State†	11	–	7	.611	22	–	10	.688
Oklahoma State	10	–	8	.556	21	–	12	.636
West Virginia	10	–	8	.556	19	–	12	.613
Baylor	10	–	8	.556	20	–	13	.606
Kansas	9	–	9	.500	22	–	11	.667
Texas Tech	6	–	12	.333	20	–	15	.571
Kansas State	5	–	13	.278	19	–	16	.543
TCU	1	–	17	.056	8	–	23	.258
† 2023 Big 12 Tournament winner As of March 24, 2023; Rankings from AP poll

The 2022–23 Texas Longhorns women's basketball team represented the University of Texas at Austin in the 2022–23 NCAA Division I women's basketball season. The team was coached by Vic Schaefer entering his third season at Texas. The Longhorns are members of the Big 12 Conference and played their home games at the new Moody Center.

This was the Longhorns' first season at the newly constructed Moody Center. Previously, Texas played at the Frank Erwin Center. This was the first time the Longhorns have a new arena since 1977 when Texas moved from the Gregory Gymnasium to the Frank Erwin Center.

== Previous season ==
=== Regular season ===
Coming into the season, Texas had a lot of momentum going into the 2021–22 season after their Elite 8 appearance in the NCAA tournament the previous season. However, Texas lost star player Charli Collier to the WNBA draft, as she was the first overall pick by the Dallas Wings. With the addition of 2 5-star athletes in Rori Harmon and Aaliyah Moore and 2 4-star athletes in Latasha Lattimore and Kyndall Hunter, the momentum was still high. Texas finished the 2021-22 regular season 23–6, 13–5 in Big 12 play. The Longhorns finished 3rd in the Big 12 behind Iowa State and Baylor. 5-star recruit Rori Harmon emerged as a top freshman as she earned many accolades such as 4-time Big 12 Freshman of the Week, All-Big 12 Second Team, Big 12 All-Defensive Team, Big 12 All-Freshman Team, Big 12 Freshman of the Year, and Big 12 tournament Most Outstanding Player. Harmon also was the first freshman in Texas women’s basketball history to earn All-American Honors. The combination of younger talent with freshmen Rori Harmon and Aaliyah Moore, plus sophomore DeYona Gaston, with the older talent of seniors Joanne Allen-Taylor, Lauren Ebo, Audrey Warren, and junior three point leader Aliyah Matharu, Texas had their most success since the 2017-18 season where the Longhorns went 24–5 during the regular season.

=== Big 12 tournament ===
Texas earned a 3-seed in the 2022 Big 12 Conference women's basketball tournament where they would square off against 6-seed Kansas State. Texas would go on to defeat Kansas State 72–65 to advance to the second round. In the second round, the Longhorns faced off against Iowa State. Coming into the game, Texas had swept the Cyclones during the regular season. Texas would go on to win 82–73 in overtime behind Rori Harmon’s 30-point career high performance, advancing them to the championship game against Baylor. Coming into the game, Texas was riding a 13-game losing streak to Baylor, having not defeated the Bears since the 2016–17 season. The Longhorns would go on to snap the losing streak defeating Baylor 67–58 in the championship game.

First round Thursday, March 10
8	Texas Tech	58
9	Oklahoma State	73
7	West Virginia	68
10	TCU	48

Quarterfinals; Friday, March 11
1	Baylor	76
9	Oklahoma State	36
4	Oklahoma	80
5	Kansas	68
2	Iowa State	66
7	West Virginia	60
3	Texas	72
6	Kansas State	65

Semifinals; Saturday, March 12
1	Baylor	91
4	Oklahoma	76
2	Iowa State	73
3	Texas	82*

Championship Game; Sunday, March 13
1	Baylor	58
3	Texas	67

*denotes overtime

=== NCAA tournament ===
Texas entered the NCAA tournament as a 2-seed where they faced off against 15-seed Fairfield. The Longhorns would go on to defeat the Stags 70–52, advancing Texas to the round of 32. In the round of 32, Texas played against 7-seed Utah. Texas defeated the Utes 78–56 sending them to the sweet 16 to match up with Ohio State. Against the Buckeyes, Texas won 66–63 advance Texas to their second consecutive elite 8. In the elite 8, the Longhorns faced Stanford, who they beat earlier in the regular season. However, Stanford prevailed against Texas, winning the game 59–50.

First round Round of 64; March 18–19
1	Stanford	78
16	Montana State	37
Stanford, California – Fri/Sun
8	Kansas	77
9	Georgia Tech	58
5	Virginia Tech	81
12	Florida Gulf Coast	84
College Park, Maryland – Fri/Sun
4	Maryland	102
13	Delaware	71
6	Ohio State	63
11	Missouri State	56
Baton Rouge, Louisiana – Sat/Mon
3	LSU	83
14	Jackson State	77
7	Utah	92
10	Arkansas	69
Austin, Texas – Fri/Sun
2	Texas	70
15	Fairfield	52

Second Round; Round of 32; March 20–21
1	Stanford	91
8	Kansas	65
12	Florida Gulf Coast	65
4	Maryland	89
6	Ohio State	79
3	LSU	64
7	Utah	56
2	Texas	78

Regional semifinals Sweet 16; March 25
1	Stanford	72
4	Maryland	66
6	Ohio State	63
2	Texas	66

Regional final Elite 8 March 27
1	Stanford	59
2	Texas	50

==== Spokane Regional final ====
ESPN

March 27
9:00 p.m.

#2 Texas Longhorns 50, #1 Stanford Cardinal 59
Scoring by quarter: 14–14, 13–16, 13–15, 10–14
Pts: Joanne Allen-Taylor (15); Rebs: Rori Harmon (7); Asts: Rori Harmon (6)	Pts: Lexie Hull (20); Rebs: Haley Jones (12); Asts: Lacie Hull; Haley Jones (4)

Spokane Arena
Attendance: 7,739
Referees: Dee Kantner, Michol Murray, Kenneth Nash

== Offseason ==
=== Returning players ===
Name	Number	Pos.	Height	Year	Hometown
Rori Harmon	3	G	5’6”	Sophomore	Houston, TX
DeYona Gaston	5	F	6'2"	Junior	Pearland, TX
Shay Holle	10	G	6’0”	Junior	Austin, TX
Kyndall Hunter	22	G	5’7”	Sophomore	Houston, TX
Aaliyah Moore	23	F	6’1”	Sophomore	Moore, OK
Femme Masudi	34	C	6’5”	Junior	Goma
Anissa Gutierrez	40	G	5’7”	Senior	Mansfield, TX

=== Departures ===
Name	Number	Pos.	Height	Year	Hometown	Reason for departure
Joanne Allen-Taylor	11	G	5'8"	Senior	Houston, TX	Graduated
Ashley Chevalier	25	G	5’7”	Sophomore	Chatsworth, CA	Transferred to Texas Tech
Lauren Ebo	1	F/C	6’4”	Senior	Washington D.C.	Transferred to Notre Dame
Audrey Warren	31	G/F	5'9"	Senior	Fort Worth, TX	Transferred to Georgia
Latasha Lattimore	35	F/C	6’4”	Freshman	Toronto, ON	Transferred to Miami
Kobe King-Hawea	4	G/F	5’11”	Junior	Point Cook, Australia	Transferred to JMU

==== Outgoing transfers ====
Name	Pos.	Height	Year	Hometown	New Team	Source
Aliyah Matharu	G	5'7"	Senior	Washington D.C.	Florida	
Ashley Chevalier	G	5’7”	Sophomore	Chatsworth, CA	Texas Tech	
Audrey Warren	G/F	5'9"	Senior	Fort Worth, TX	Georgia	
Lauren Ebo	F/C	6’4”	Senior	Washington D.C.	Notre Dame	
Latasha Lattimore	F/C	6’4”	Freshman	Toronto, ON	Miami	
Kobe King-Hawea	G/F	5’11”	Junior	Point Cook, Australia	JMU	

==== Coaching staff departures ====
Name	Position	New Team	New Position	Source
Dionnah Jackson-Durrett	Associate head coach	Kansas City	Head coach	
April Phillips	Assistant coach	San Jose State	Head coach	
Calamity McEntire	Assistant coach	Illinois	Associate head coach	
Jazzmun Holmes	Coordinator of player development	Kansas City	Director of basketball operations	

=== Acquisitions ===
==== Incoming transfers ====
Name	Pos.	Height	Year	Hometown	Previous Team	Source
Sonya Morris	G	5’10”	Graduate Student	St. Louis, MO	DePaul	
Taylor Jones	F	6’4”	Junior	Forney, TX	Oregon State	
Khadija Faye	C	6’4”	Junior	Dakar, Senegal	Texas Tech	
Shaylee Gonzales	G	5’10”	Graduate Student	Gilbert, AZ	BYU	

==== 2022 recruiting class ====
College recruiting information
Name	Hometown	School	Height	Weight	Commit date
Ndjakalenga Mwenentanda; W	Sioux Falls, SD	Washington High School	6 ft 1 in (1.85 m)	N/A	
Ndjakalenga Mwenentanda; W	Recruit ratings: ESPN: (95)				
Amina Muhammad; F	Desoto, TX	Desoto High School	6 ft 3 in (1.91 m)	N/A	
Amina Muhammad; F	Recruit ratings: ESPN: (93)				
Jordana Codio; G	Jupiter, FL	Montverde Academy	6 ft 1 in (1.85 m)	N/A	
Jordana Codio; G	Recruit ratings: ESPN: (93)				
Overall recruiting rankings:
Note: In many cases, Scout, Rivals, 247Sports, and ESPN may conflict in their listings of height and weight.; In these cases, the average was taken. ESPN grades are on a 100-point scale.; Sources: "2022 Player Commits". ESPN.com.

==== 2023 recruiting class ====
College recruiting information (2023)
Name	Hometown	School	Height	Weight	Commit date
Madison Booker; W	Ridgeland, MS	Germantown High School	6 ft 1 in (1.85 m)	N/A	Sep 28, 2022
Madison Booker; W	Recruit ratings: ESPN: (96)				
Gisella Maul; G	Cedar Park, TX	Cedar Park High School	5 ft 11 in (1.80 m)	N/A	Apr 25, 2022
Gisella Maul; G	Recruit ratings: ESPN: (94)				
Overall recruiting rankings:
Note: In many cases, Scout, Rivals, 247Sports, and ESPN may conflict in their listings of height and weight.; In these cases, the average was taken. ESPN grades are on a 100-point scale.; Sources: "2023 Player Commits". ESPN.com.

=== Coaching staff additions ===
Name	Position	Previous Team	Previous Position	Source
Elena Lovato	Associate head coach	Texas (Note: Lovato was an assistant at Texas during the 2020-21 season. However, she was on a coaching hiatus for the 2021–22 season.)	Assistant coach	
Lindsay Wisdom-Hylton	Assistant coach/recruiting coordinator	Purdue	Assistant coach	
Sydney Carter	Director of player development	Texas A&M |Player development/assistant recruiting coordinator		

== Preseason ==
=== Big 12 Media Poll ===
Big 12 media poll
Predicted finish	Team	Votes (1st place)
1	Iowa State	75 (4)
2	Texas	74 (4)
3	Oklahoma	65 (1)
4	Baylor	62 (1)
5	Kansas	49
6	Kansas State	37
7	Texas Tech	29
8	West Virginia	26
9	Oklahoma State	23
10	TCU	10

=== Award watch lists ===
Listed in the order that they were released

Award	Player	Position	Year	Source
Nancy Lieberman Award	Rori Harmon	PG	Sophomore	
Ann Meyers Drysdale Award	Sonya Morris	G	Graduate Student	
Katrina McClain Award	Aaliyah Moore	F	Sophomore	
Cheryl Miller Award	Shay Holle	F	Junior	
Lisa Leslie Award	Taylor Jones	F	Junior	
Wade Trophy	Rori Harmon	PG	Sophomore	

=== Preseason All-Big 12 teams ===
Position	Player	Class
First Team
G	Rori Harmon (Note: Unanimous pick)	Sophomore
F	Aaliyah Moore	Sophomore
Honorable Mention
G	Shaylee Gonzales	Graduate Student
G	Sonya Morris	Graduate Student
F	Taylor Jones	Junior

== Roster ==
2022–23 Texas Longhorns women's basketball team
Players
Coaches

Pos.	#	Name	Height	Year	Previous school	Hometown
G	2	Shaylee Gonzales	5 ft 10 in (1.78 m)	GS	BYU	Gilbert, AZ
PG	3	Rori Harmon	5 ft 6 in (1.68 m)	So	Cypress Creek	Houston, TX
G	4	Anissa Gutierrez	5 ft 7 in (1.7 m)	Sr	Mansfield Summit High School	Mansfield, TX
F	5	DeYona Gaston	6 ft 2 in (1.88 m)	Jr	Pearland	Pearland, TX
G	10	Shay Holle	6 ft 0 in (1.83 m)	Jr	Westlake	Austin, TX
G	11	Sonya Morris	5 ft 10 in (1.78 m)	GS	DePaul	St. Louis, MO
G	13	Jordana Codio (injured)	6 ft 1 in (1.85 m)	Fr	Montverde Academy	Jupiter, FL
F	14	Amina Muhammad	6 ft 4 in (1.93 m)	Fr	DeSoto High School	DeSoto, TX
G	15	Ndjakalenga Mwenentanda	6 ft 2 in (1.88 m)	Fr	Washington High School	Sioux Falls, SD
C	20	Khadija Faye	6 ft 4 in (1.93 m)	Jr	Texas Tech	Dakar, Senegal
G	22	Kyndall Hunter	5 ft 7 in (1.7 m)	So	Cypress Creek	Houston, TX
F	23	Aaliyah Moore (injured)	6 ft 1 in (1.85 m)	So	Moore	Moore, OK
C	34	Femme Masudi	6 ft 5 in (1.96 m)	Jr	South Georgia Technical College	Goma, DR Congo
F	44	Taylor Jones	6 ft 4 in (1.93 m)	Jr	Oregon State	Forney, TX

Head coach

- Vic Schaefer (Texas A&M)

Assistant coach(es)

- Elena Lovato (Pittsburg State)
- Lindsay Wisdom-Hylton (Purdue)
- Blair Schaefer (Mississippi State)

Legend

- (C) Team captain
- (S) Suspended
- (I) Ineligible
- (W) Walk-on
- Injured
- Current redshirt

Roster

=== Support staff ===
2022-23 Texas Longhorns support staff
- Sydney Carter – Director of player development
- Zack Zillner – Sports Performance Coach
- Kristin Grant – Director of Video and Recruiting Digital Services
- Christy Smith – Director of operations
- Dennis Colwell – Administrative Associate
- Ryan Yablonsky – Graduate assistant

=== Roster outlook ===
Senior	Junior	Sophomore	Freshman
Anissa Gutierrez — G Shaylee Gonzales — G Sonya Morris — G	DeYona Gaston — F Femme Masudi — C Khadija Faye — F Shay Holle — G Taylor Jones — F	Aaliyah Moore — F Rori Harmon — G Kyndall Hunter — G	Amina Muhammad — F Jordana Codio — G Ndjakalenga Mwenentanda — F

== Schedule and results ==
Date time, TV	Rank^{#}	Opponent^{#}	Result	Record	High points	High rebounds	High assists	Site (attendance) city, state
Exhibition
October 30, 2022*; 2:00 p.m., LHN	No. 3	DePaul	W 105–62	0–0	21 – Morris	10 – Faye	10 – Harmon	Moody Center (3,465); Austin, TX
November 4, 2022*; 7:00 p.m.	No. 3	Wayland Baptist	W 107–46	0–0	19 – Moore	9 – Mwenentanda	6 – Tied	Moody Center (2,367); Austin, TX
Non-Conference Regular Season
November 11, 2022*; 7:00 p.m., LHN	No. 3	Louisiana	W 68–45	1–0	21 – Jones	7 – Muhammad	3 – Tied	Moody Center (5,658); Austin, TX
November 14, 2022*; 5:30 p.m., FS1	No. 3	at No. 5 UConn	L 76–83	1–1	21 – Morris	8 – Jones	6 – Gonzales	Harry A. Gampel Pavilion (10,167); Storrs, CT
November 19, 2022*; 4:00 p.m., FloHoops	No. 3	vs. Marquette; Battle 4 Atlantis quarterfinals	L 61–68	1–2	13 – Morris	11 – Moore	3 – Gonzales	Imperial Arena (376); Paradise Island, Bahamas
November 20, 2022*; 6:30 p.m., FloHoops	No. 3	vs. No. 6 Louisville; Battle 4 Atlantis consolation 2nd round	L 63–71	1–3	21 – Moore	8 – Moore	4 – Mwenentanda	Imperial Arena (365); Paradise Island, Bahamas
November 21, 2022*; 6:30 p.m., FloHoops	No. 19	vs. Rutgers; Battle 4 Atlantis 7th place game	W 82–44	2–3	14 – Muhammad	6 – Gonzales	6 – Morris	Imperial Arena (155); Paradise Island, Bahamas
November 27, 2022*; 1:00 p.m., LHN	No. 19	Princeton	W 74–50	3–3	15 – Morris	10 – Jones	2 – Tied	Moody Center (5,137); Austin, TX
December 2, 2022*; 7:00 p.m., LHN	No. 22	South Florida	L 65–70	3–4	14 – Gaston	11 – Gonzales	4 – Harmon	Moody Center (5,021); Austin, TX
December 4, 2022*; 2:00 p.m., LHN	No. 22	Southern	W 92–43	4–4	22 – Gonzales	7 – Faye	10 – Harmon	Moody Center (4,987); Austin, TX
December 11, 2022*; 2:00 p.m., LHN		Alabama State	W 107–54	5–4	20 – Gaston	16 – Gaston	5 – Harmon	Moody Center (5,116); Austin, TX
December 14, 2022*; 2:00 p.m.		at Jackson State	W 75–58	6–4	16 – Morris	12 – Faye	6 – Harmon	Williams Assembly Center (1,200); Jackson, MS
December 18, 2022*; 2:30 p.m., ESPN2		vs. USC; Pac-12 Coast-to-Coast Challenge	W 62–48	7–4	22 – Gonzales	6 – Tied	7 – Harmon	American Airlines Center (4,700); Dallas, TX
December 21, 2022*; 2:00 p.m., LHN		Houston Christian	W 96–34	8–4	20 – Gaston	11 – Faye	6 – Harmon	Moody Center (5,021); Austin, TX
December 28, 2022*; 7:00 p.m., LHN		Texas A&M–Commerce	W 96–53	9–4	15 – Harmon	11 – Muhammad	10 – Harmon	Moody Center (4,589); Austin, TX
Big 12 Regular Season
December 31, 2022; 2:00 p.m., LHN		Kansas State	W 87–41	10–4 (1–0)	15 – Tied	8 – Tied	13 – Harmon	Moody Center (5,126); Austin, TX
January 4, 2023; 6:30 p.m., ESPN+		at TCU	W 81–69	11–4 (2–0)	20 – Gaston	13 – Faye	10 – Harmon	Schollmaier Arena (2,137); Fort Worth, TX
January 7, 2023; 6:00 p.m., ESPN+		at Oklahoma State	L 82–86	11–5 (2–1)	22 – Gaston	9 – Faye	4 – Harmon	Gallagher-Iba Arena (2,228); Stillwater, OK
January 10, 2023; 7:00 p.m., LHN		No. 23 Kansas	W 72–59	12–5 (3–1)	26 – Gonzales	10 – Muhammad	11 – Harmon	Moody Center (4,903); Austin, TX
January 15, 2023; 4:00 p.m., ESPN2		No. 15 Iowa State	W 68–53	13–5 (4–1)	17 – Gaston	7 – Tied	7 – Harmon	Moody Center (6,405); Austin, TX
January 18, 2023; 7:00 p.m., ESPN+	No. 25	at Texas Tech	L 64–68	13–6 (4–2)	17 – Morris	6 – Tied	9 – Harmon	United Supermarkets Arena (5,604); Lubbock, TX
January 22, 2023; 4:00 p.m., ESPN2	No. 25	at Baylor	W 68–55	14–6 (5–2)	13 – Tied	11 – Gaston	6 – Harmon	Ferrell Center (5,593); Waco, TX
January 25, 2023; 7:00 p.m., LHN		No. 14 Oklahoma	W 78–58	15–6 (6–2)	19 – Gaston	6 – Tied	7 – Gonzales	Moody Center (6,623); Austin, TX
January 28, 2023; 7:00 p.m., LHN		Oklahoma State	W 78–69	16–6 (7–2)	19 – Jones	9 – Faye	7 – Harmon	Moody Center (6,123); Austin, TX
February 1, 2023; 6:00 p.m., ESPN+	No. 24	at West Virginia	W 69–56	17–6 (8–2)	17 – Morris	9 – Gaston	6 – Harmon	WVU Coliseum (1,651); Morgantown, WV
February 4, 2023; 4:00 p.m., ESPN+	No. 24	at Kansas	W 68–65	18–6 (9–2)	24 – Gaston	10 – Faye	6 – Harmon	Allen Fieldhouse (3,301); Lawrence, KS
February 8, 2023; 7:00 p.m., LHN	No. 20	Texas Tech	W 80–71	19–6 (10–2)	25 – Gonzales	7 – Faye	10 – Harmon	Moody Center (5,571); Austin, TX
February 11, 2023; 4:00 p.m., LHN	No. 20	TCU	W 70–50	20–6 (11–2)	16 – Tied	11 – Jones	6 – Gonzales	Moody Center (6,877); Austin, TX
February 13, 2023; 6:00 p.m., ESPN2	No. 17	at No. 22 Iowa State	L 61–66	20–7 (11–3)	19 – Harmon	11 – Muhammad	6 – Harmon	Hilton Coliseum (10,681); Ames, IA
February 19, 2023; 3:00 p.m., ESPNU	No. 17	West Virginia	W 74–48	21–7 (12–3)	18 – Gonzales	11 – Faye	6 – Harmon	Moody Center (6,023); Austin, TX
February 25, 2023; 1:00 p.m., ESPN+	No. 19	at No. 13 Oklahoma	W 67–45	22–7 (13–3)	19 – Gonzales	11 – Gaston	8 – Harmon	Lloyd Noble Center (10,127); Norman, OK
February 27, 2023; 6:00 p.m., ESPN2	No. 12	Baylor	L 54–63	22–8 (13–4)	15 – Jones	13 – Jones	7 – Harmon	Moody Center (10,763); Austin, TX
March 4, 2023; 4:00 p.m., ESPN+	No. 12	at Kansas State	W 80–52	23–8 (14–4)	21 – Gonzales	9 – Gaston	12 – Harmon	Bramlage Coliseum (3,877); Manhattan, KS
Big 12 Tournament (2–1)
March 10, 2023; 1:30 p.m., ESPNU	(1) No. 15	vs. (9) Kansas State; Quarterfinals	W 60–42	24–8	13 – Gaston	11 – Jones	7 – Harmon	Municipal Auditorium (5,238); Kansas City, MO
March 11, 2023; 12:00 p.m., ESPN+	(1) No. 15	vs. (4) Oklahoma State; Semifinals	W 64–57	25–8	17 – Gonzales	7 – Tied	10 – Harmon	Municipal Auditorium (5,937); Kansas City, MO
March 12, 2023; 1:00 p.m., ESPN2	(1) No. 15	vs. (3) Iowa State; Championship	L 51–61	25–9	12 – Tied	9 – Tied	7 – Harmon	Municipal Auditorium (5,045); Kansas City, MO
NCAA Tournament
March 18, 2023*; 9:00 p.m., ESPN	(4 S4) No. 15	(13 S4) East Carolina; First round	W 79–40	26–9	20 – Gonzales	12 – Gaston	12 – Harmon	Moody Center (4,915); Austin, TX
March 20, 2023*; 6:00 p.m., ESPN	(4 S4) No. 15	(5 S4) Louisville; Second round	L 51–73	26–10	12 – Gaston	9 – Harmon	3 – Harmon	Moody Center (5,430); Austin, TX
*Non-conference game. ^{#}Rankings from AP Poll. (#) Tournament seedings in parentheses. S4=Seattle 4. All times are in Central Time.

Source:Schedule

== Postseason ==
=== Big 12 tournament ===
First round Thursday, March 9 ESPN+
8	Texas Tech	69
9	Kansas State	79
7	Kansas	52
10	TCU	57

Quarterfinals; Friday, March 10; ESPNU/ESPN+
1	Texas	60
9	Kansas State	42
4	Oklahoma State	62
5	West Virginia	61
2	Oklahoma	77
10	TCU	76
3	Iowa State	74
6	Baylor	63

Semifinals; Saturday, March 11; ESPN+
1	Texas	64
4	Oklahoma State	57
2	Oklahoma	72
3	Iowa State	82

Championship game Sunday, March 12; ESPN2
1	Texas	51
3	Iowa State	61

*denotes overtime

== Team and individual statistics ==
Individual player statistics (Final)
			Minutes		Scoring		Total FGs			3-point FGs			Free-Throws			Rebounds								
Player	GP	GS	Tot	Avg	Pts	Avg	FG	FGA	Pct	3FG	3FA	Pct	FT	FTA	Pct	Off	Def	Tot	Avg	A	PF	TO	Stl	Blk
Shaylee Gonzales	36	36	1196	33.2	458	12.7	155	372	41.7%	54	154	35.1%	94	109	86.2%	55	99	154	4.3	96	86	84	56	17
DeYona Gaston	36	32	915	25.4	437	12.1	183	355	51.5%	0	1	0.0%	71	103	68.9%	84	123	207	5.8	39	94	56	35	40
Sonya Morris	26	24	687	26.4	296	11.4	118	284	41.5%	47	121	38.8%	13	20	65.0%	14	55	69	2.7	49	41	48	33	10
Rori Harmon	31	31	1114	35.9	347	11.2	140	380	36.8%	8	51	15.7%	59	105	56.2%	34	129	163	5.3	228	55	99	72	8
Aaliyah Moore	9	9	184	20.4	101	11.2	34	61	55.7%	0	1	0.0%	33	46	71.7%	16	27	43	4.8	16	23	27	4	3
Taylor Jones	27	4	536	19.9	257	9.5	102	180	56.7%	0	0	0.0%	53	79	67.1%	57	97	154	5.7	4	66	32	11	62
Khadija Faye	36	27	538	14.9	213	5.9	76	140	54.3%	0	0	0.0%	61	88	69.3%	88	96	184	5.1	17	97	39	37	34
Shay Holle	36	14	911	25.3	214	5.9	80	195	41.0%	35	90	38.9%	19	31	61.3%	22	48	70	1.9	57	75	54	35	19
Ndjakalenga Mwenentanda	31	3	378	12.2	135	4.4	44	131	33.6%	3	17	17.6%	44	63	69.8%	36	33	69	2.2	18	52	29	15	4
Amina Muhammad	36	0	671	18.6	142	3.9	60	124	48.4%	0	0	0.0%	22	50	44.0%	74	103	177	4.9	34	88	53	26	14
Anissa Gutierrez	10	0	20	2.0	4	0.4	1	6	16.7%	0	0	0.0%	2	2	100.0%	0	0	0	0.0	1	1	3	1	0
Sarah Graves	1	0	1	1.0	0	0.0	0	0	0.0%	0	0	0.0%	0	0	0.0%	0	0	0	0.0	0	0	0	0	0
Total	36	–	7200	200.0	2623	72.9	1002	2247	44.6%	147	435	33.8%	472	698	67.6%	546	880	1426	39.6	559	680	548	326	214
Opponents	36	–	7200	200.0	2068	57.4	707	1879	37.6%	175	526	33.3%	479	692	69.2%	381	786	1167	32.4	356	715	718	281	107

Legend
GP	Games played	GS	Games started	Avg	Average per game
FG	Field-goals made	FGA	Field-goal attempts	Off	Offensive rebounds
Def	Defensive rebounds	A	Assists	TO	Turnovers
Blk	Blocks	Stl	Steals	High	Team high

== Awards and honors ==
Weekly honors
Honors	Player	Position	Date Awarded	Ref.
Big 12 Freshman of the Week	DeYona Gaston	F	December 12, 2022	
Big 12 Co-Player of the Week	Rori Harmon	PG	January 3, 2023	
USBWA National Women's Player of the Week	Shaylee Gonzales	G	January 17, 2023	

Conference honors
Honors	Player	Position
Big 12 Coach of the Year	Vic Schaefer	Head coach
Big 12 Defensive Player of the Year	Rori Harmon	G
Big 12 Newcomer of the Year	Shaylee Gonzales	G
All-Big 12 First Team	Rori Harmon	G
All-Big 12 First Team	DeYona Gaston	F
All-Big 12 Second Team	Shaylee Gonzales	G
Big 12 All-Defensive Team	Rori Harmon	G
Big 12 All-Freshman Team	Amina Muhammad	F

== Rankings ==
Ranking movements Legend: ██ Increase in ranking ██ Decrease in ranking — = Not ranked RV = Received votes
	Week																			
Poll	Pre	1	2	3	4	5	6	7	8	9	10	11	12	13	14	15	16	17	18	Final
AP	3	3	19	22	RV	RV	RV	RV	RV	—	25	RV	24	20	17	19	12	15	15	Not released
Coaches	3	5	16	18	RV	RV	RV	RV	RV	RV	25	RV	25	23	22	20	17	16	16	19

== See also ==
- 2022–23 Texas Longhorns men's basketball team
