= 2022–23 Alabama Crimson Tide women's basketball team =

American college basketball season

2022–23 Alabama Crimson Tide women's basketball

NCAA tournament, First Round
- Conference: Southeastern Conference
- Record: 20–11 (9–7 SEC)
- Head coach: Kristy Curry (10th season)
- Assistant coaches: Kelly Curry; Janese Constantine; Roman Tubner
- Home arena: Coleman Coliseum

2022–23 SEC women's basketball standings
	Conf.				Overall
Team	W		L	PCT	W		L	PCT
No. 1 South Carolina†	16	–	0	1.000	36	–	1	.973
No. 9 LSU	15	–	1	.938	34	–	2	.944
No. 24 Tennessee	13	–	3	.813	25	–	12	.676
Ole Miss	11	–	5	.688	25	–	9	.735
Mississippi State	9	–	7	.563	22	–	11	.667
Georgia	9	–	7	.563	22	–	12	.647
Alabama	9	–	7	.563	20	–	11	.645
Arkansas	7	–	9	.438	24	–	13	.649
Missouri	6	–	10	.375	18	–	14	.563
Florida	5	–	11	.313	19	–	14	.576
Auburn	5	–	11	.313	16	–	15	.516
Vanderbilt	3	–	13	.188	12	–	19	.387
Kentucky	2	–	14	.125	12	–	19	.387
Texas A&M	2	–	14	.125	9	–	20	.310
† 2023 SEC tournament winner As of April 2, 2023; Rankings from AP poll

The 2022–23 Alabama Crimson Tide women's basketball team represented University of Alabama in the 2022–23 college basketball season. Led by tenth year head coach Kristy Curry, the team played their games at Coleman Coliseum and were members of the Southeastern Conference.

== Preseason ==
=== SEC media poll ===
The SEC media poll was released on October 18, 2022.

Media poll
Predicted finish	Team
1	South Carolina
2	Tennessee
3	LSU
4	Arkansas
5	Ole Miss
6	Florida
7	Kentucky
8	Mississippi State
9	Georgia
10	Alabama
11	Texas A&M
12	Missouri
13	Auburn
14	Vanderbilt

== Schedule and results ==
Date time, TV	Rank^{#}	Opponent^{#}	Result	Record	Site (attendance) city, state
Non-conference regular season
November 7, 2022*; 5:00 p.m., SECN+		Alabama A&M	W 98–51	1–0	Coleman Coliseum (10,472); Tuscaloosa, AL
November 10, 2022*; 6:00 p.m., ESPN+		at Tulane	W 72–61	2–0	Devlin Fieldhouse (494); New Orleans, LA
November 16, 2022*; 6:00 p.m., ESPN+		at South Florida	L 59–67	2–1	Yuengling Center (2,224); Tampa, FL
November 21, 2022*; 1:30 p.m.		vs. No. 17 Utah; Baha Mar Hoops Pink Flamingo Championship	L 86–93	2–2	Baha Mar Convention Center; Nassau, Bahamas
November 23, 2022*; 10:00 a.m.		vs. Wake Forest; Baha Mar Hoops Pink Flamingo Championship	W 61–58	3–2	Baha Mar Convention Center; Nassau, Bahamas
November 27, 2022*; 2:00 p.m., SECN+		Gardner–Webb	W 89–60	4–2	Coleman Coliseum (1,898); Tuscaloosa, AL
November 30, 2022*; 6:00 p.m., ESPN+		at Mercer	W 88–52	5–2	Hawkins Arena (989); Macon, GA
December 3, 2022*; 12:00 p.m., SECN+		Chattanooga	W 61–52	6–2	Coleman Coliseum (1,849); Tuscaloosa, AL
December 11, 2022*; 2:00 p.m., ESPN+		at Southern Miss	W 56–47	7–2	Reed Green Coliseum (1,037); Hattiesburg, MS
December 15, 2022*; 6:00 p.m., SECN		Little Rock	W 69–44	8–2	Coleman Coliseum (1,807); Tuscaloosa, AL
December 18, 2022*; 2:00 p.m., SECN+		Norfolk State	W 92–30	9–2	Coleman Coliseum (1,843); Tuscaloosa, AL
December 20, 2022*; 2:00 p.m., SECN+		Southeastern Louisiana	W 55–45	10–2	Coleman Coliseum (1,888); Tuscaloosa, AL
December 22, 2022*; 12:00 p.m., SECN+		North Florida	W 89–25	11–2	Coleman Coliseum (1,885); Tuscaloosa, AL
SEC regular season
December 29, 2022; 6:00 p.m., SECN+		Georgia	W 56–53	12–2 (1–0)	Coleman Coliseum (2,234); Tuscaloosa, AL
January 1, 2023; 11:00 a.m., SECN		at Tennessee	L 76–89	12–3 (1–1)	Thompson–Boling Arena (8,214); Knoxville, TN
January 5, 2023; 6:00 p.m., SECN+		Missouri	L 65–66	12–4 (1–2)	Coleman Coliseum (1,800); Tuscaloosa, AL
January 8, 2023; 4:00 p.m., SECN		at Auburn	W 88–57	13–4 (2–2)	Neville Arena (3,078); Auburn, AL
January 15, 2023; 4:00 p.m., SECN		at Ole Miss	W 63–58	14–4 (3–2)	SJB Pavilion (3,630); Oxford, MS
January 19, 2023; 6:00 p.m., SECN+		Texas A&M	W 61–46	15–4 (4–2)	Coleman Coliseum (2,201); Tuscaloosa, AL
January 23, 2023; 6:00 p.m., SECN		No. 4 LSU	L 51–89	15–5 (4–3)	Coleman Coliseum (2,586); Tuscaloosa, AL
January 26, 2023; 6:00 p.m., SECN		at Arkansas	W 69–66	16–5 (5–3)	Bud Walton Arena (3,206); Fayetteville, AR
January 29, 2023; 12:00 p.m., ESPN2		No. 1 South Carolina	L 52–65	16–6 (5–4)	Coleman Coliseum (4,255); Tuscaloosa, AL
February 5, 2023; 4:00 p.m., SECN		at Missouri	W 76–69	17–6 (6–4)	Mizzou Arena (3,698); Columbia, MO
February 9, 2023; 6:00 p.m., SECN+		at Kentucky	W 72–65	18–6 (7–4)	Memorial Coliseum (3,277); Lexington, KY
February 12, 2023; 4:00 p.m., SECN		Auburn	W 69–46	19–6 (8–4)	Coleman Coliseum (2,735); Tuscaloosa, AL
February 16, 2023; 6:00 p.m., SECN+		Vanderbilt	W 88–70	20–6 (9–4)	Coleman Coliseum (1,884); Tuscaloosa, AL
February 19, 2023; 4:30 p.m., SECN+		at Mississippi State	L 45–60	20–7 (9–5)	Humphrey Coliseum (6,011); Starkville, MS
February 23, 2023; 5:00 p.m., SECN+		at Florida	L 77–81	20–8 (9–6)	O'Connell Center (1,433); Gainesville, FL
February 26, 2023; 2:00 p.m., SECN+		Ole Miss	L 55–57	20–9 (9–7)	Coleman Coliseum (2,707); Tuscaloosa, AL
SEC Tournament
March 2, 2023; 7:30 p.m., SECN	(6)	vs. (14) Kentucky; Second Round	L 58–71	20–10	Bon Secours Wellness Arena (7,691); Greenville, SC
NCAA tournament
March 18, 2023; 4:30 p.m., ESPN2	(10 S3)	vs. (7 S3) Baylor; First Round	L 74–78	20–11	Harry A. Gampel Pavilion (8,043); Storrs, CT
*Non-conference game. ^{#}Rankings from AP Poll. (#) Tournament seedings in parentheses. All times are in Central.

== Rankings ==
Ranking movements Legend: ██ Increase in ranking ██ Decrease in ranking — = Not ranked RV = Received votes
	Week																			
Poll	Pre	1	2	3	4	5	6	7	8	9	10	11	12	13	14	15	16	17	18	Final
AP	RV	RV	RV	—	—	—	—	—	—	—	—	—	—	—	—	—				Not released
Coaches	—	—	—	—	—	—	—	—	—	—	—	—	—	—	RV	RV				

== See also ==
- 2022–23 Alabama Crimson Tide men's basketball team
