= 2023 SEC women's basketball tournament =

American college basketball postseason tournament

- Classification: Division I
- Season: 2022–23
- Teams: 14
- Site: Bon Secours Wellness Arena; Greenville, SC
- Champions: South Carolina (7th title)
- Winning coach: Dawn Staley (7th title)
- MVP: Aliyah Boston (South Carolina)
- Attendance: 57,801
- Television: SEC Network, ESPNU, ESPN

2022–23 SEC women's basketball standings
	Conf.				Overall
Team	W		L	PCT	W		L	PCT
No. 1 South Carolina†	16	–	0	1.000	36	–	1	.973
No. 9 LSU	15	–	1	.938	34	–	2	.944
No. 24 Tennessee	13	–	3	.813	25	–	12	.676
Ole Miss	11	–	5	.688	25	–	9	.735
Mississippi State	9	–	7	.563	22	–	11	.667
Georgia	9	–	7	.563	22	–	12	.647
Alabama	9	–	7	.563	20	–	11	.645
Arkansas	7	–	9	.438	24	–	13	.649
Missouri	6	–	10	.375	18	–	14	.563
Florida	5	–	11	.313	19	–	14	.576
Auburn	5	–	11	.313	16	–	15	.516
Vanderbilt	3	–	13	.188	12	–	19	.387
Kentucky	2	–	14	.125	12	–	19	.387
Texas A&M	2	–	14	.125	9	–	20	.310
† 2023 SEC tournament winner As of April 2, 2023; Rankings from AP poll

The 2023 Southeastern Conference women's basketball tournament was a postseason women's basketball tournament for the Southeastern Conference was held at the Bon Secours Wellness Arena in Greenville, South Carolina, from March 1 through 5, 2023. South Carolina won the tournament, earning an automatic bid to the NCAA Division I women's tournament.

== Seeds ==
Seed	School	Conference record	Overall record	Tiebreaker
1	South Carolina^{‡†}	16–0	29–0	
2	LSU^{†}	15–1	27–1	
3	Tennessee^{†}	13–3	21–10	
4	Ole Miss^{†}	11–5	22–7	
5	Mississippi State^{#}	9–7	20–9	1–1 vs. Tennessee
6	Alabama^{#}	9–7	20–9	0–1 vs. Tennessee, 1–0 vs. Georgia
7	Georgia^{#}	9–7	20–10	0–1 vs. Tennessee, 0–1 vs. Alabama
8	Arkansas^{#}	7–9	20–11	
9	Missouri^{#}	6–10	17–12	
10	Auburn^{#}	5–11	15–13	1–0 vs. Florida
11	Florida	5–11	16–13	0–1 vs. Auburn
12	Vanderbilt	3–13	12–18	
13	Texas A&M	2–14	7–19	1–0 vs. Kentucky
14	Kentucky	2–14	10–18	0–1 vs. Texas A&M
‡ – SEC regular season champions, and tournament No. 1 seed. † – Received a double-bye in the conference tournament. # – Received a single-bye in the conference tournament. Overall records include all games played in the SEC Tournament.

== Schedule ==
Game	Time*	Matchup^{#}	Score	Television	Attendance
First round – Wednesday, March 1
1	11:00 am	No. 12 Vanderbilt vs. No. 13 Texas A&M	70–77	SEC Network	8,125
2	1:30 pm	No. 11 Florida vs. No. 14 Kentucky	57–72	SEC Network	8,125
Second round – Thursday, March 2
3	12:00 pm	No. 8 Arkansas vs. No. 9 Missouri	85–74	SEC Network	5,531
4	2:30 pm	No. 5 Mississippi State vs. No. 13 Texas A&M	72–79	SEC Network	5,531
5	6:00 pm	No. 7 Georgia vs. No. 10 Auburn	63–47	SEC Network	7,691
6	8:30 pm	No. 6 Alabama vs. No. 14 Kentucky	71–58	SEC Network	7,691
Quarterfinals – Friday, March 3
7	12:00 pm	No. 1 South Carolina vs. No. 8 Arkansas	93–66	SEC Network	7,481
8	2:30 pm	No. 4 Ole Miss vs. No. 13 Texas A&M	77–60	SEC Network	7,481
9	6:00 pm	No. 2 LSU vs. No. 7 Georgia	83–66	SEC Network	6,299
10	8:30 pm	No. 3 Tennessee vs. No. 14 Kentucky	80–71	SEC Network	6,299
Semifinals – Saturday, March 4
11	4:30 pm	No. 1 South Carolina vs. No. 4 Ole Miss	80–51	ESPNU	10,471
12	7:00 pm	No. 2 LSU vs No. 3 Tennessee	67–69	ESPNU	10,471
Championship – Sunday, March 5
13	3:00 pm	No. 1 South Carolina vs No. 3 Tennessee	74–58	ESPN	12,203
*Game times in ET. # – Rankings denote tournament seed

== Bracket ==
First round Wednesday, March 1 SECN
12	Vanderbilt	70
13	Texas A&M	77
11	Florida	57
14	Kentucky	72

Second round Thursday, March 2 SECN
8	Arkansas	85
9	Missouri	74
5	Mississippi State	72
13	Texas A&M	79
7	Georgia	63
10	Auburn	47
6	Alabama	58
14	Kentucky	71

Quarterfinals; Friday, March 3 SECN
1	South Carolina	93
8	Arkansas	66
4	Ole Miss	77
13	Texas A&M	60
2	LSU	83
7	Georgia	66
3	Tennessee	80
14	Kentucky	71

Semifinals; Saturday, March 4 ESPNU
1	South Carolina	80
4	Ole Miss	51
2	LSU	67
3	Tennessee	69

Championship; Sunday, March 5 ESPN
1	South Carolina	74
3	Tennessee	58
