= Marta Suárez =

Spanish basketball player (born 2002)

No. 77 – Phoenix Mercury
- Position: Forward
- League: WNBA

Personal information
- Born: May 7, 2002 (age 24) Oviedo, Spain
- Listed height: 6 ft 3 in (1.91 m)

Career information
- High school: Institut Joaquim Blume (Barcelona, Spain)
- College: Tennessee (2020–2023); California (2023–2025); TCU (2025–2026)
- WNBA draft: 2026: 2nd round, 16th overall pick
- Drafted by: Seattle Storm
- Playing career: 2019–present

Career history
- 2019–2020: Segle XXI
- 2026–present: Phoenix Mercury

Career highlights
- First-team All-Big 12 (2026); SEC All-Freshman team (2021)
- Stats at Basketball Reference
Medals
Women's basketball
Representing Spain
FIBA U16 European Championship
Bronze medal – third place	2018 Lithuania	Team

Marta Suárez Rodríguez (born May 7, 2002) is a Spanish professional basketball player for the Phoenix Mercury of the Women's National Basketball Association (WNBA). She played college basketball for the Tennessee Lady Volunteers, California Golden Bears, and TCU Horned Frogs.

== Early life ==
Suárez was born on May 7, 2002, in Oviedo, Spain, to Maximino Suárez Diaz and Marisa Rodríguez Medina. She attended Institut Joaquim Blume in Barcelona. In 2019–20, Suárez played with Segle XXI in the second-tier Liga Femenina 2 (LF2) and led her team with 12.7 points and 5.6 rebounds per game. She was rated as a four-star recruit by Blue Star Europe and committed to playing college basketball at Tennessee over Duke and Washington.

== College career ==
Suárez began her college career with the Tennessee Lady Volunteers of the Southeastern Conference (SEC). As a freshman in 2020–21, she started her first 14 games, but her season ended prematurely due to a lower leg injury. Suárez earned SEC All-Freshman honors after averaging 4.1 points and 3.6 rebounds per game. She subsequently redshirted in 2021–22 to rehab her leg. In her return to play in 2022–23, Suárez averaged 4.9 points and 3.0 rebounds per game. However, midway through the season, she announced that she would be stepping away from basketball for personal reasons, returning to Spain and continuing her studies online.

Suárez transferred to California ahead of her junior season. In 2023–24, she started all 34 games for the Golden Bears and averaged 11.9 points and 4.9 rebounds per game. In 2024–25, Suárez improved her averages to 12.9 points, 7.2 rebounds, and 2.4 assists per game and helped California reach the 2025 NCAA tournament. She earned second-team all-tournament honors at the 2025 ACC tournament.

== Professional career ==
=== WNBA ===
On April 13, 2026, Suárez was drafted in the second round, 16th overall, by the Seattle Storm in the 2026 WNBA draft. She was later traded to the Golden State Valkyries along with a 2028 second-round pick in exchange for Flau'jae Johnson (8th pick overall). Suárez played in one preseason game with the Valkyries on April 25, recording 5 points and 3 rebounds against Seattle, before she was waived on May 2. After clearing waivers on May 5, she was signed by the Phoenix Mercury on a developmental contract on May 6. On July 9, 2026, Suárez was signed to a seven-day hardship contract with the Mercury. She went on to sign two more seven-day contracts with the team before signing a rest-of-season contract on August 3.

== National team career ==
Suárez won a bronze medal with the Spain national under-16 team at the 2018 FIBA U16 Women's European Championship, averaging 7.0 points and 2.9 rebounds per game. She later played for the 2021 FIBA Under-19 Women's Basketball World Cup, averaging 6.7 points and 5.0 rebounds as Spain finished in seventh place.

== Career statistics ==
Legend
GP	Games played	GS	Games started	MPG	Minutes per game	RPG	Rebounds per game
APG	Assists per game	SPG	Steals per game	BPG	Blocks per game	PPG	Points per game
TO	Turnovers per game	FG%	Field-goal percentage	3P%	3-point field-goal percentage	FT%	Free-throw percentage
**Bold**	Career best	°	League leader

=== College ===
Year	Team	GP	GS	MPG	FG%	3P%	FT%	RPG	APG	SPG	BPG	TO	PPG
2020–21	Tennessee	22	14	16.0	40.7	29.6	75.0	3.6	0.8	0.4	0.0	1.8	4.1
2021–22	Tennessee	Did not play due to injury											
2022–23	Tennessee	14	0	12.5	37.5	18.8	77.4	3.0	0.4	0.2	0.2	**1.6**	4.9
2023–24	California	34	34	28.1	40.2	29.6	74.3	6.9	1.6	0.8	**0.5**	3.1	11.9
2024–25	California	32	32	29.1	**45.8**	31.5	82.0	7.2	**2.4**	0.8	0.4	4.2	12.9
2025–26	TCU	**38**	**38**	**31.4**	45.3	**37.0**	**89.2**	**7.4**	2.3	**1.4**	0.2	3.2	**17.1**
**Career**		140	118	25.8	43.4	32.8	81.2	6.2	1.7	0.8	0.3	3.1	11.6
Statistics retrieved from Sports-Reference.
