= 2022–23 Arkansas Razorbacks women's basketball team =

Intercollegiate basketball season

2022–23 Arkansas Razorbacks women's basketball

WNIT, Great 8
- Conference: Southeastern Conference
- Record: 24–13 (7–9 SEC)
- Head coach: Mike Neighbors (6th season)
- Assistant coaches: Todd Schaefer; Lacey Goldwire; Pauline Love
- Home arena: Bud Walton Arena

2022–23 SEC women's basketball standings
	Conf.				Overall
Team	W		L	PCT	W		L	PCT
No. 1 South Carolina†	16	–	0	1.000	36	–	1	.973
No. 9 LSU	15	–	1	.938	34	–	2	.944
No. 24 Tennessee	13	–	3	.813	25	–	12	.676
Ole Miss	11	–	5	.688	25	–	9	.735
Mississippi State	9	–	7	.563	22	–	11	.667
Georgia	9	–	7	.563	22	–	12	.647
Alabama	9	–	7	.563	20	–	11	.645
Arkansas	7	–	9	.438	24	–	13	.649
Missouri	6	–	10	.375	18	–	14	.563
Florida	5	–	11	.313	19	–	14	.576
Auburn	5	–	11	.313	16	–	15	.516
Vanderbilt	3	–	13	.188	12	–	19	.387
Kentucky	2	–	14	.125	12	–	19	.387
Texas A&M	2	–	14	.125	9	–	20	.310
† 2023 SEC tournament winner As of April 2, 2023; Rankings from AP poll

The 2022–23 Arkansas Razorbacks women's basketball team represented the University of Arkansas during the 2022–23 NCAA Division I women's basketball season. The Razorbacks, led by sixth-year head coach Mike Neighbors, played their home games at Bud Walton Arena and competed as members of the Southeastern Conference (SEC).

The Razorbacks finished the season with a 24–13 overall record, 7–9 in the SEC conference. In the postseason, they were defeated by South Carolina in the quarterfinals of the SEC Tournament, but qualified to enter the Women's National Invitation Tournament where they advanced to the quarterfinals before losing to Kansas.

== Previous season ==
The Razorbacks finished the season 18–14 (7–9 SEC) to finish tied for eighth in the conference. They lost in the first round of the NCAA Tournament to Utah, 92–69.

== Schedule and results ==
Date time, TV	Rank^{#}	Opponent^{#}	Result	Record	Site (attendance) city, state
Exhibition
November 2, 2022*; 7:00 p.m.		Arkansas–Fort Smith	W 92–62		Bud Walton Arena (642); Fayetteville, AR
Non-conference regular season
November 7, 2022*; 6:00 p.m.		at Arkansas–Pine Bluff	W 70–50	1–0	H.O. Clemmons Arena (3,128); Pine Bluff, AR
November 11, 2022*; 10:30 a.m., SECN+		Central Arkansas	W 72–34	2–0	Bud Walton Arena (7,410); Fayetteville, AR
November 14, 2022*; 7:00 p.m., SECN+		Tulsa	W 62–50	3–0	Bud Walton Arena (2,511); Fayetteville, AR
November 17, 2022*; 7:00 p.m., SECN+		Kent State	W 80–59	4–0	Bud Walton Arena (2,265); Fayetteville, AR
November 20, 2022*; 1:00 p.m., ESPN+		at Little Rock	W 93–49	5–0	Jack Stephens Center (2,879); Little Rock, AR
November 24, 2022*; 5:45 p.m., ESPN3		vs. Northern Arizona; Paradise Jam	W 82–73	6–0	Sports and Fitness Center; Saint Thomas, USVI
November 25, 2022*; 8:00 p.m., ESPN3		vs. Clemson; Paradise Jam	W 76–62	7–0	Sports and Fitness Center (1,724); Saint Thomas, USVI
November 26, 2022*; 8:00 p.m., ESPN3		vs. No. 25 Kansas State; Paradise Jam	W 69–53	8–0	Sports and Fitness Center (2,024); Saint Thomas, USVI
December 1, 2022*; 7:00 p.m., SECN+		Troy	W 87–70	9–0	Bud Walton Arena (3,019); Fayetteville, AR
December 4, 2022*; 2:00 p.m., SECN+		Oral Roberts	W 92–58	10–0	Bud Walton Arena (2,947); Fayetteville, AR
December 8, 2022*; 7:00 p.m., SECN+	No. 21	Lamar	W 63–50	11–0	Bud Walton Arena (2,268); Fayetteville, AR
December 11, 2022*; 3:00 p.m., SECN+	No. 21	Arkansas State; Rivalry	W 77–63	12–0	Bud Walton Arena (3,826); Fayetteville, AR
December 17, 2022*; 1:00 p.m., FloHoops	No. 21	at No. 16 Creighton	W 83–75	13–0	D. J. Sokol Arena (1,050); Omaha, NE
December 20, 2022*; 3:00 p.m.	No. 17	vs. No. 16 Oregon; San Diego Invitational	L 78–85	13–1	Pechanga Arena (321); San Diego, CA
December 21, 2022*; 3:00 p.m.	No. 17	vs. South Florida; San Diego Invitational	L 65–66 ^{OT}	13–2	Pechanga Arena (303); San Diego, CA
SEC regular season
December 29, 2022; 6:00 p.m., ESPN2	No. 24	No. 9 LSU	L 45–69	13–3 (0–1)	Bud Walton Arena (5,285); Fayetteville, AR
January 1, 2023; 1:00 p.m., SECN+	No. 24	at Kentucky	W 71–50	14–3 (1–1)	Memorial Coliseum (3,284); Lexington, KY
January 5, 2023; 7:00 p.m., SECN+		Florida	W 102–74	15–3 (2–1)	Bud Walton Arena (4,524); Fayetteville, AR
January 8, 2023; 2:00 p.m., SECN+		at Missouri	W 77–55	16–3 (3–1)	Mizzou Arena (4,260); Columbia, MO
January 16, 2023; 6:00 p.m., SECN+		Vanderbilt	W 84–81	17–3 (4–1)	Bud Walton Arena (3,693); Fayetteville, AR
January 19, 2023; 8:00 p.m., SECN		at No. 3 LSU	L 76–79	17–4 (4–2)	Pete Maravich Assembly Center (7,293); Baton Rouge, LA
January 22, 2023; 2:00 p.m., ESPN2		at No. 1 South Carolina	L 46–92	17–5 (4–3)	Colonial Life Arena (13,349); Columbia, SC
January 26, 2023; 6:00 p.m., SECN		Alabama	L 66–69	17–6 (4–4)	Bud Walton Arena (3,206); Fayetteville, AR
January 29, 2023; 4:00 p.m., SECN		Ole Miss	L 73–76 ^{OT}	17–7 (4–5)	Bud Walton Arena (6,677); Fayetteville, AR
February 5, 2023; 2:00 p.m., SECN		at Auburn	W 54–51	18–7 (5–5)	Neville Arena (2,569); Auburn, AL
February 9, 2023; 8:00 p.m., SECN		at Vanderbilt	L 70–78	18–8 (5–6)	Memorial Gymnasium (1,978); Nashville, TN
February 12, 2023; 2:00 p.m., SECN+		Missouri	W 61–33	19–8 (6–6)	Bud Walton Arena (4,492); Fayetteville, AR
February 16, 2023; 6:00 p.m., SECN		Tennessee	L 67–87	19–9 (6–7)	Bud Walton Arena (3,243); Fayetteville, AR
February 19, 2023; 11:00 a.m., SECN		at Georgia	L 48–71	19–10 (6–8)	Stegeman Coliseum (4,109); Athens, GA
February 23, 2023; 8:00 p.m., SECN		at Mississippi State	L 73–87	19–11 (6–9)	Humphrey Coliseum (4,940); Starkville, MS
February 26, 2023; 11:00 a.m., SECN		Texas A&M	W 78–65	20–11 (7–9)	Bud Walton Arena (4,408); Fayetteville, AR
SEC Tournament
March 2, 2023; 11:00 am, SECN	(8)	vs. (9) Missouri; Second Round	W 85–74	21–11	Bon Secours Wellness Arena (5,531); Greenville, SC
March 3, 2023; 11:00 am, SECN	(8)	vs. (1) No. 1 South Carolina; Quarterfinals	L 66–93	21–12	Bon Secours Wellness Arena; Greenville, SC
WNIT
March 16, 2023*; 7:00 pm, SECN+		Louisiana Tech; First Round	W 69–47	22–12	Bud Walton Arena (1,460); Fayetteville, AR
March 20, 2023*; 7:00 pm		Stephen F. Austin; Second Round	W 60–37	23–12	Bud Walton Arena (3,017); Fayetteville, AR
March 24, 2023*; 7:00 pm, SECN+		Texas Tech; Super 16	W 71–66	24–12	Bud Walton Arena (3,560); Fayetteville, AR
March 26, 2023*; 2:00 pm		at Kansas; Great 8	L 64–78	24–13	Allen Fieldhouse; Lawrence, KS
*Non-conference game. ^{#}Rankings from AP Poll. (#) Tournament seedings in parentheses. All times are in Central.

== Rankings ==
Ranking movements Legend: ██ Increase in ranking ██ Decrease in ranking — = Not ranked RV = Received votes
	Week																				
Poll	Pre	1	2	3	4	5	6	7	8	9	10	11	12	13	14	15	16	17	18	19	Final
AP	RV	RV	—	—	RV	21	21	17	24												Not released
Coaches	RV	RV	RV	RV	RV	22	22	19	23												

== See also ==
- 2022–23 Arkansas Razorbacks men's basketball team
