= Ashlyn Watkins =

American basketball player

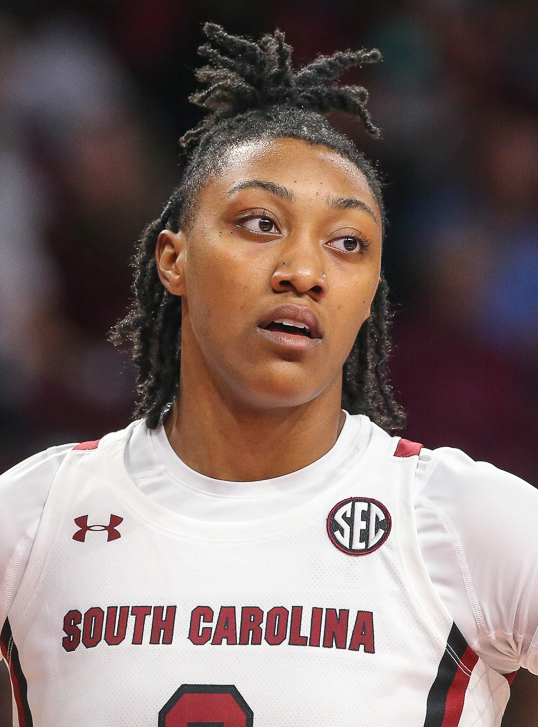
- Watkins with South Carolina in 2022

No. 2 – South Carolina Gamecocks
- Position: Forward
- League: Southeastern Conference

Personal information
- Born: October 5, 2003 (age 23) South Carolina
- Listed height: 6 ft 3 in (1.91 m)

Career information
- High school: Cardinal Newman (Columbia, South Carolina)
- College: South Carolina (2022–present)

Career highlights
- NCAA champion (2024); Second-team All-SEC (2024); McDonald's All-American (2022)

Ashlyn Watkins (born October 5, 2003) is an American college basketball player for the South Carolina Gamecocks of the Southeastern Conference (SEC).

== High school career ==
Watkins attended Cardinal Newman High School in Columbia, South Carolina, where she led the basketball team to four straight SCISA class 3A state titles. She was named a McDonald's All-American and the South Carolina Gatorade Player of the Year in 2022. Watkins won the McDonald's All-American Dunk Contest.

Watkins started dunking in middle school while attending Cardinal Newman.

== College career ==
In March 2022, Watkins won the Powerade JamFest dunk contest.

On November 17, 2022, Watkins stole the ball in the closing seconds of No. 1 South Carolina's 85–31 road win against Clemson. Once in possession of the ball, Watkins dribbled the ball to the basket and slammed it, the first dunk in South Carolina women's basketball history.

== Career statistics ==
Legend
GP	Games played	GS	Games started	MPG	Minutes per game	RPG	Rebounds per game
APG	Assists per game	SPG	Steals per game	BPG	Blocks per game	PPG	Points per game
TO	Turnovers per game	FG%	Field-goal percentage	3P%	3-point field-goal percentage	FT%	Free-throw percentage
**Bold**	Career best	°	League leader

=== College ===
Year	Team	GP	GS	MPG	FG%	3P%	FT%	RPG	APG	SPG	BPG	TO	PPG
2022–23	South Carolina	32	0	10.7	**56.3**	**33.3**	46.9	**3.1**	0.4	0.7	0.8	**0.9**	4.9
2023–24	South Carolina	**38**	**9**	**20.6**	55.0	0.0	55.6	**7.4**	**1.1**	**1.3**	**2.4**	1.5	**9.2**
2024–25	South Carolina	14	0	18.9	51.2	0.0	**68.2**	6.1	**1.1**	1.3	1.9	0.8	7.2
**Career**		84	9	16.5	54.7	16.7	54.7	5.5	0.9	1.0	1.7	1.2	7.3
Statistics retrieved from Sports-Reference.

== Legal issues ==
On the morning of August 31, 2024, Watkins was arrested on an assault charge. As Watkins allegedly also prevented her victim from leaving after an argument, an additional kidnapping charge was added. That afternoon, Watkins was released after posting a $30,000 bond. In addition to being barred from having direct or indirect contact with the victim, Watkins also could not return to the school, with a bond condition requiring her to stay 1,000 yards away from the victim's home, work, school and place of worship. However, Watkins did have permission to travel out of state for games and practice. A South Carolina spokesperson stated that "We are aware of the situation and are continuing to gather information." Watkins has not commented on the arrest or allegations.

In November, the charges against Watkins were dismissed.
