= 2022–23 Auburn Tigers women's basketball team =

American college basketball season

2022–23 Auburn Tigers women's basketball

WNIT, Second Round
- Conference: Southeastern Conference
- Record: 16–15 (5–11 SEC)
- Head coach: Johnnie Harris (2nd season)
- Associate head coach: Fred Williams; Damitria Buchanan
- Assistant coach: Ketara Chapel
- Home arena: Neville Arena

2022–23 SEC women's basketball standings
	Conf.				Overall
Team	W		L	PCT	W		L	PCT
No. 1 South Carolina†	16	–	0	1.000	36	–	1	.973
No. 9 LSU	15	–	1	.938	34	–	2	.944
No. 24 Tennessee	13	–	3	.813	25	–	12	.676
Ole Miss	11	–	5	.688	25	–	9	.735
Mississippi State	9	–	7	.563	22	–	11	.667
Georgia	9	–	7	.563	22	–	12	.647
Alabama	9	–	7	.563	20	–	11	.645
Arkansas	7	–	9	.438	24	–	13	.649
Missouri	6	–	10	.375	18	–	14	.563
Florida	5	–	11	.313	19	–	14	.576
Auburn	5	–	11	.313	16	–	15	.516
Vanderbilt	3	–	13	.188	12	–	19	.387
Kentucky	2	–	14	.125	12	–	19	.387
Texas A&M	2	–	14	.125	9	–	20	.310
† 2023 SEC tournament winner As of April 2, 2023; Rankings from AP poll

The 2022–23 Auburn Tigers women's basketball team represented Auburn University in the 2022–23 college basketball season. Led by second year head coach Johnnie Harris, the team played their games at Neville Arena and were members of the Southeastern Conference.

== Schedule and results ==
Date time, TV	Rank^{#}	Opponent^{#}	Result	Record	Site (attendance) city, state
Exhibition
November 3, 2022*; 7:00 p.m.		Tuskegee	W 81–59		Neville Arena; Auburn, AL
Non-conference regular season
November 8, 2022*; 7:00 p.m., SECN+		Sam Houston State	W 90–76	1–0	Neville Arena (1,913); Auburn, AL
November 10, 2022*; 7:00 p.m., SECN+		South Alabama	W 71–62	2–0	Neville Arena (1,955); Auburn, AL
November 16, 2022*; 7:00 p.m., SECN+		Georgia Tech	L 51–57	2–1	Neville Arena (1,932); Auburn, AL
November 20, 2022*; 2:00 p.m., SECN+		Alabama State	W 88–49	3–1	Neville Arena (2,065); Auburn, AL
November 25, 2022*; 7:45 p.m., FloSports		vs. No. 6 Indiana; Las Vegas Invitational	L 81–96	3–2	The Mirage; Paradise, NV
November 26, 2022*; 5:30 p.m., FloSports		vs. Colorado State; Las Vegas Invitational	W 74–73	4–2	The Mirage; Paradise, NV
November 30, 2022*; 12:00 p.m., SECN+		Little Rock	W 70–48	5–2	Neville Arena (1,855); Auburn, AL
December 3, 2022*; 2:00 p.m., SECN+		UCF	W 86–46	6–2	Neville Arena (1,892); Auburn, AL
December 11, 2022*; 2:00 p.m., SECN+		Louisiana	W 81–41	7–2	Neville Arena (2,447); Auburn, AL
December 15, 2022*; 7:00 p.m., SECN+		North Carolina A&T	W 79–63	8–2	Neville Arena (1,795); Auburn, AL
December 18, 2022*; 12:00 p.m., SECN+		Samford	W 91–37	9–2	Neville Arena (2,013); Auburn, AL
December 20, 2022*; 12:00 p.m., SECN+		North Florida	W 77–49	10–2	Neville Arena (1,984); Auburn, AL
SEC regular season
December 29, 2022; 6:00 p.m., SECN+		at Ole Miss	L 47–79	10–3 (0–1)	SJB Pavilion (2,369); Oxford, MS
January 1, 2023; 3:00 p.m., SECN		Missouri	L 56–62	10–4 (0–2)	Neville Arena (2,131); Auburn, AL
January 5, 2023; 6:00 p.m., SECN+		at No. 1 South Carolina	L 42–94	10–5 (0–3)	Colonial Life Arena (11,552); Columbia, SC
January 8, 2023; 4:00 p.m., SECN		Alabama	L 57–88	10–6 (0–4)	Neville Arena (3,078); Auburn, AL
January 15, 2023; 2:00 p.m., SECN+		at No. 5 LSU	L 54–84	10–7 (0–5)	Pete Maravich Assembly Center (11,475); Baton Rouge, LA
January 19, 2023; 7:00 p.m., SECN+		at Mississippi State	L 58–72	10–8 (0–6)	Humphrey Coliseum (5,221); Starkville, MS
January 22, 2023; 4:00 p.m., SECN		Ole Miss	W 77–76 ^{OT}	11–8 (1–6)	Neville Arena (3,093); Auburn, AL
January 26, 2023; 6:00 p.m., SEC+		at Kentucky	W 71–68	12–8 (2–6)	Memorial Coliseum (3,123); Lexington, KY
January 30, 2023; 6:00 p.m., SECN		Florida	W 66–55	13–8 (3–6)	Neville Arena (2,551); Auburn, AL
February 5, 2023; 2:00 p.m., SECN		Arkansas	L 51–54	13–9 (3–7)	Neville Arena (2,569); Auburn, AL
February 9, 2023; 7:00 p.m., SECN+		No. 1 South Carolina	L 48–83	13–10 (3–8)	Neville Arena (2,860); Auburn, AL
February 12, 2023; 4:00 p.m., SECN		at Alabama	L 46–69	13–11 (3–9)	Coleman Coliseum (2,735); Tuscaloosa, AL
February 16, 2023; 7:00 p.m., SECN+		Texas A&M	W 65–55	14–11 (4–9)	Neville Arena (2,293); Auburn, AL
February 19, 2023; 11:00 a.m., ESPN2		at Tennessee	L 76–83	14–12 (4–10)	Thompson–Boling Arena (9,039); Knoxville, TN
February 23, 2023; 6:00 p.m., SECN+		at Georgia	L 59–70	14–13 (4–11)	Stegeman Coliseum (2,571); Athens, GA
February 26, 2023; 3:00 p.m., SECN		Vanderbilt	W 78–76	15–13 (5–11)	Neville Arena (2,687); Auburn, AL
SEC Tournament
March 2, 2023; 5:00 p.m., SECN	(10)	vs. (7) Georgia; Second Round	L 47–63	15–14	Bon Secours Wellness Arena (7,691); Greenville, SC
WNIT
March 17, 2023*; 7:00 pm, SECN+		Tulane; First Round	W 73–58	16–14	Neville Arena (921); Auburn, AL
March 20, 2023*; 6:00 pm, ACCNX		at Clemson; Second Round	L 55–56	16–15	Littlejohn Coliseum (698); Clemson, SC
*Non-conference game. ^{#}Rankings from AP Poll. (#) Tournament seedings in parentheses. All times are in Central.

== See also ==
- 2022–23 Auburn Tigers men's basketball team
