= 2022–23 Vanderbilt Commodores women's basketball team =

American college basketball season

2022–23 Vanderbilt Commodores women's basketball
- Conference: Southeastern Conference
- Record: 12–19 (3–13 SEC)
- Head coach: Shea Ralph (2nd season)
- Associate head coach: Tom Garrick
- Assistant coaches: Ashley Earley; Kevin DeMille
- Home arena: Memorial Gymnasium

2022–23 SEC women's basketball standings
	Conf.				Overall
Team	W		L	PCT	W		L	PCT
No. 1 South Carolina†	16	–	0	1.000	36	–	1	.973
No. 9 LSU	15	–	1	.938	34	–	2	.944
No. 24 Tennessee	13	–	3	.813	25	–	12	.676
Ole Miss	11	–	5	.688	25	–	9	.735
Mississippi State	9	–	7	.563	22	–	11	.667
Georgia	9	–	7	.563	22	–	12	.647
Alabama	9	–	7	.563	20	–	11	.645
Arkansas	7	–	9	.438	24	–	13	.649
Missouri	6	–	10	.375	18	–	14	.563
Florida	5	–	11	.313	19	–	14	.576
Auburn	5	–	11	.313	16	–	15	.516
Vanderbilt	3	–	13	.188	12	–	19	.387
Kentucky	2	–	14	.125	12	–	19	.387
Texas A&M	2	–	14	.125	9	–	20	.310
† 2023 SEC tournament winner As of April 2, 2023; Rankings from AP poll

The 2022–23 Vanderbilt Commodores women's basketball team represented Vanderbilt University in the 2022–23 college basketball season. Led by second year head coach Shea Ralph, the team played their games at Memorial Gymnasium and were members of the Southeastern Conference.

== Schedule and results ==
Date time, TV	Rank^{#}	Opponent^{#}	Result	Record	Site (attendance) city, state
Non-conference regular season
November 7, 2022*; 6:30 p.m.		at Western Kentucky	W 82–71	1–0	E. A. Diddle Arena; Bowling Green, KY
November 10, 2022*; 6:30 p.m., SECN+		Samford	W 81–51	2–0	Memorial Gymnasium; Nashville, TN
November 13, 2022*; 1:00 p.m.		at Columbia	W 74–63	3–0	Levien Gymnasium (913); New York, NY
November 15, 2022*; 11:00 a.m., SECN+		Tarleton State	W 84–48	4–0	Memorial Gymnasium (2,663); Nashville, TN
November 17, 2022*; 6:30 p.m., SECN+		Austin Peay	W 70–61	5–0	Memorial Gymnasium (1,695); Nashville, TN
November 20, 2022*; 2:00 p.m., SECN+		Saint Joseph's	L 59–67	5–1	Memorial Gymnasium (1,717); Nashville, TN
November 24, 2022*; 5:30 p.m., FloHoops		vs. No. 13 NC State; Cancún Challenge	L 73–82	5–2	Hard Rock Hotel Riviera Maya (161); Puerto Aventuras, QR, MX
November 25, 2022*; 3:00 p.m.		vs. Northern Iowa; Cancún Challenge	L 62–65	5–3	Hard Rock Hotel Riviera Maya (125); Puerto Aventuras, QR, MX
November 29, 2022*; 6:30 p.m., SECN+		USC Upstate	W 74–45	6–3	Memorial Gymnasium (1,762); Nashville, TN
December 1, 2022*; 6:00 p.m.		at East Tennessee State	L 31–44	6–4	J. Madison Brooks Gymnasium (707); Johnson City, TN
December 4, 2022*; 11:00 a.m., SECN		UT Martin	L 54–66	6–5	Memorial Gymnasium (1,913); Nashville, TN
December 8, 2022*; 6:00 p.m.		at Louisiana Tech	W 75–70 ^{OT}	7–5	Thomas Assembly Center (1,515); Ruston, LA
December 18, 2022*; 2:00 p.m., SECN+		Lipscomb	W 72–71 ^{OT}	8–5	Memorial Gymnasium (2,480); Nashville, TN
December 21, 2022*; 1:00 p.m., SECN+		Alabama A&M	W 76–46	9–5	Memorial Gymnasium (1,900); Nashville, TN
SEC regular season
December 29, 2022; 5:00 p.m., SECN+		Mississippi State	L 44–72	9–6 (0–1)	Memorial Gymnasium (2,456); Nashville, TN
January 1, 2023; 2:00 p.m., SECN+		at No. 9 LSU	L 63–88	9–7 (0–2)	Pete Maravich Assembly Center (7,285); Baton Rouge, LA
January 5, 2023; 6:00 p.m., SECN+		at Ole Miss	L 53–74	9–8 (0–3)	SJB Pavilion (2,235); Oxford, MS
January 8, 2023; 12:00 p.m., SECN		Tennessee; Rivalry	L 71–84	9–9 (0–4)	Memorial Gymnasium (4,830); Nashville, TN
January 16, 2023; 6:00 p.m., SECN		at Arkansas	L 81–84	9–10 (0–5)	Bud Walton Arena (3,693); Fayetteville, AR
January 19, 2023; 6:00 p.m., SECN		No. 1 South Carolina	L 48–96	9–11 (0–6)	Memorial Gymnasium (3,028); Nashville, TN
January 22, 2023; 1:00 p.m., SECN+		at Florida	L 55–73	9–12 (0–7)	O'Connell Center (1,325); Gainesville, FL
January 29, 2023; 12:00 p.m., SECN		Texas A&M	W 88–79	10–12 (1–7)	Memorial Gymnasium (2,376); Nashville, TN
February 2, 2023; 8:00 p.m., SECN		at Missouri	L 69–86	10–13 (1–8)	Mizzou Arena (2,523); Columbia, MO
February 5, 2023; 12:00 p.m., SECN		Georgia	L 61–79	10–14 (1–9)	Memorial Gymnasium (2,398); Nashville, TN
February 9, 2023; 8:00 p.m., SECN		Arkansas	W 78–70	11–14 (2–9)	Memorial Gymnasium (1,978); Nashville, TN
February 12, 2023; 1:00 p.m., SECN+		at Tennessee; Rivalry	L 59–86	11–15 (2–10)	Thompson–Boling Arena (9,224); Knoxville, TN
February 16, 2023; 6:00 p.m., SECN+		at Alabama	L 70–88	11–16 (2–11)	Coleman Coliseum (1,884); Tuscaloosa, AL
February 19, 2023; 2:00 p.m., SECN+		Kentucky	W 79–57	12–16 (3–11)	Memorial Gymnasium (2,468); Nashville, TN
February 23, 2023; 6:30 p.m., SECN+		No. 5 LSU	L 63–82	12–17 (3–12)	Memorial Gymnasium (3,274); Nashville, TN
February 26, 2023; 3:00 p.m., SECN		at Auburn	L 76–78	12–18 (3–13)	Neville Arena (2,687); Auburn, AL
SEC Tournament
March 1, 2023; 11:00 a.m., SECN	(12)	vs. (13) Texas A&M; First Round	L 70–77	12–19	Bon Secours Wellness Arena (8,125); Greenville, SC
*Non-conference game. ^{#}Rankings from AP Poll. (#) Tournament seedings in parentheses. All times are in Central.

== See also ==
- 2022–23 Vanderbilt Commodores men's basketball team
