= 2022–23 Tennessee Lady Volunteers basketball team =

Intercollegiate basketball season

2022–23 Tennessee Lady Volunteers basketball

NCAA tournament, Sweet Sixteen
- Conference: Southeastern Conference

Ranking
- Coaches: No. 20
- AP: No. 24
- Record: 25–12 (13–3 SEC)
- Head coach: Kellie Harper (4th season)
- Assistant coaches: Samantha Willams; Jon Harper; Joy McCorvey
- Home arena: Thompson–Boling Arena

2022–23 SEC women's basketball standings
	Conf.				Overall
Team	W		L	PCT	W		L	PCT
No. 1 South Carolina†	16	–	0	1.000	36	–	1	.973
No. 9 LSU	15	–	1	.938	34	–	2	.944
No. 24 Tennessee	13	–	3	.813	25	–	12	.676
Ole Miss	11	–	5	.688	25	–	9	.735
Mississippi State	9	–	7	.563	22	–	11	.667
Georgia	9	–	7	.563	22	–	12	.647
Alabama	9	–	7	.563	20	–	11	.645
Arkansas	7	–	9	.438	24	–	13	.649
Missouri	6	–	10	.375	18	–	14	.563
Florida	5	–	11	.313	19	–	14	.576
Auburn	5	–	11	.313	16	–	15	.516
Vanderbilt	3	–	13	.188	12	–	19	.387
Kentucky	2	–	14	.125	12	–	19	.387
Texas A&M	2	–	14	.125	9	–	20	.310
† 2023 SEC tournament winner As of April 2, 2023; Rankings from AP poll

The 2022–23 Tennessee Lady Volunteers basketball team represented the University of Tennessee in the 2022–23 college basketball season. Led by former Lady Vol Kellie Harper, entering her fourth year as head coach, the team played its games at Thompson–Boling Arena as members of the Southeastern Conference.

The Lady Vols finished the season with a 25–12 overall record, 13–3 in the conference. They advanced to the finals of the SEC tournament, where they lost to South Carolina. Finishing strong in the conference, the Lady Vols earned an at-large bid to the NCAA tournament, advancing to the Sweet Sixteen before losing to Virginia Tech.

== Previous season ==
The 2021–22 team finished the season 25–9, 11–5 in third place in SEC play. They lost in the semifinals of the SEC tournament to their rivals, Kentucky, who went on to win the tournament. The Lady Vols also received an at-large bid to the NCAA tournament, where they lost in the Sweet Sixteen to Louisville.

== Roster ==
2022–23 Tennessee Lady Volunteers women's basketball team
Players
Coaches

Pos.	#	Name	Height	Year	Previous school	Hometown
G	0	Brooklynn Miles	5 ft 4 in (1.63 m)	So	Franklin County HS	Frankfort, KY
G/F	1	Sara Puckett	6 ft 2 in (1.88 m)	So	Muscle Shoals HS	Muscle Shoals, AL
F	2	Rickea Jackson	6 ft 2 in (1.88 m)	Sr	Mississippi State University	Detroit, MI
G	4	Jordan Walker	5 ft 8 in (1.73 m)	RS Sr	Western Michigan University	Muskegon, MI
G	5	Kaiya Wynn	6 ft 0 in (1.83 m)	So	Foster HS	Richmond, TX
G	10	Jessie Rennie (injured)	5 ft 6 in (1.68 m)	Sr	Bendigo Senior Secondary College	Bendigo, AUS
F	11	Karoline Striplin	6 ft 3 in (1.91 m)	So	Geneva HS	Hartford, AL
G	12	Edie Darby	5 ft 7 in (1.7 m)	Fr	Greenfield HS	Greenfield, TN
G/F	13	Justine Pissott	6 ft 4 in (1.93 m)	Fr	Red Bank Catholic HS	Toms River, NJ
F	14	Jasmine Franklin	6 ft 1 in (1.85 m)	Sr	Missouri State University	Fayetteville, AR
G	15	Jasmine Powell	5 ft 6 in (1.68 m)	Sr	University of Minnesota	Detroit, MI
C	20	Tamari Key (injured)	6 ft 5 in (1.96 m)	Sr	Cary HS	Cary, NC
G/F	21	Tess Darby	6 ft 1 in (1.85 m)	Jr	Greenfield HS	Greenfield, TN
G	25	Jordan Horston	6 ft 2 in (1.88 m)	Sr	Columbus Africentric Early College	Columbus, OH
G/F	33	Marta Suárez	6 ft 2 in (1.88 m)	RS So	Joaquim Blume Institute	Oviedo, Spain
F	53	Jillian Hollingshead	6 ft 5 in (1.96 m)	So	University of Georgia	Gainesville, GA

Head coach

- Kellie Harper (Tennessee)

Assistant coach(es)

- Samantha Williams (Auburn)
- Jon Harper (Auburn)
- Joy McCorvey (St. John's)

Legend

- (C) Team captain
- (S) Suspended
- (I) Ineligible
- (W) Walk-on
- Injured
- Current redshirt

Roster

== Schedule ==
Date time, TV	Rank^{#}	Opponent^{#}	Result	Record	High points	High rebounds	High assists	Site (attendance) city, state
Exhibition
10/30/2022*; 2:00 pm, SECN+	No. 5	Carson–Newman	W 108–63		17 – Horston	10 – Franklin	3 – Tied	Thompson–Boling Arena (8,103); Knoxville, TN
Regular season
11/8/2022*; 8:30 pm, BTN	No. 5	at No. 14 Ohio State	L 75–87	0–1	20 – Horston	13 – Horston	4 – Tied	Value City Arena (6,402); Columbus, OH
11/10/2022*; 6:30 pm, SECN+	No. 5	UMass	W 74–65	1–1	24 – Jackson	11 – Jackson	7 – Powell	Thompson–Boling Arena (7,571); Knoxville, TN
11/14/2022*; 6:00 pm, ESPN2	No. 11	No. 12 Indiana	L 67–79	1–2	17 – Jackson	10 – Powell	4 – Tied	Thompson–Boling Arena (7,768); Knoxville, TN
11/19/2022*; Noon, FloSports	No. 11	vs. Rutgers; Battle 4 Atlantis quarterfinals	W 94–54	2–2	26 – Jackson	7 – Suárez	8 – Powell	Atlantis Paradise Island (212); Paradise Island, Bahamas
11/20/2022*; Noon, FloSports	No. 11	vs. UCLA; Battle 4 Atlantis semifinals	L 63–80	2–3	14 – Jackson	3 – Tied	2 – Horston	Atlantis Paradise Island (247); Paradise Island, Bahamas
11/21/2022*; 2:30 pm, ESPNU	No. 23т	vs. Gonzaga; Battle 4 Atlantis 3rd-place game	L 72–73	2–4	19 – Horston	9 – Franklin	4 – Powell	Atlantis Paradise Island (118); Paradise Island, Bahamas
11/25/2022*; 7:00 pm, SECN	No. 23т	Colorado	W 69–51	3–4	23 – Horston	8 – Horston	4 – Tied	Thompson–Boling Arena (7.509); Knoxville, TN
11/27/2022*; 2:00 pm, SECN+	No. 23т	Eastern Kentucky	W 105–71	4–4	15 – Jackson	8 – Tied	5 – Tied	Thompson–Boling Arena (7,014); Knoxville, TN
12/4/2022*; 1:00 pm, ESPN2		No. 9 Virginia Tech; Jimmy V Classic	L 56–59	4–5	26 – Horston	11 – Horston	6 – Powell	Thompson–Boling Arena (8,507); Knoxville, TN
12/6/2022*; 6:30 pm, SECN+		Chattanooga	W 69–39	5–5	14 – Horston	6 – Powell	4 – Puckett	Thompson–Boling Arena (6,871); Knoxville, TN
12/11/2022*; 2:00 pm, SECN+		Wright State	W 96–57	6–5	17 – Jackson	6 – Hollingshead	5 – Horston	Thompson–Boling Arena (7,261); Knoxville, TN
12/14/2022*; 6:30 pm, SECN+		UCF	W 99–64	7–5	15 – Horston	10 – Franklin	5 – Tied	Thompson–Boling Arena (7,188); Knoxville, TN
12/18/2022*; 3:00 pm, ABC		at No. 2 Stanford; Rivalry	L 70–77	7–6	19 – Horston	10 – Horston	3 – Horston	Maples Pavilion (4,480); Stanford, CA
12/27/2022*; 6:30 pm, SECN+		Wofford	W 92–53	8–6	16 – Jackson	10 – Franklin	6 – Striplin	Thompson-Boling Arena (7,909); Knoxville, TN
12/29/2022; 6:00 pm, SECN+		at Florida	W 77–67	9–6 (1–0)	28 – Jackson	9 – Jackson	2 – Tied	O'Connell Center (2,656); Gainesville, FL
1/1/2023; Noon, SECN		Alabama	W 89–76	10–6 (2–0)	22 – Jackson	8 – Striplin	9 – Horston	Thompson–Boling Arena (8,214); Knoxville, TN
1/5/2023; 6:30 pm, SECN+		Mississippi State	W 80–69	11–6 (3–0)	27 – Horston	14 – Horston	5 – Horston	Thompson–Boling Arena (7,428); Knoxville, TN
1/8/2023; 1:00 pm, SECN		at Vanderbilt; Rivalry	W 84–71	12–6 (4–0)	23 – Jackson	8 – Horston	8 – Horston	Memorial Gymnasium (4,830); Nashville, TN
1/12/2023; 9:00 pm, SECN		Texas A&M	W 62–50	13–6 (5–0)	22 – Jackson	9 – Hollingshead	8 – Walker	Reed Arena (3,222); College Station, TX
1/15/2023; 1:00 pm, SECN		Georgia	W 68–55	14–6 (6–0)	23 – Jackson	7 – Tied	8 – Walker	Thompson-Boiling Arena (9,772); Knoxville, TN
1/19/2023; 6:30 pm, SECN+		Florida	W 74–56	15–6 (7–0)	16 – Jackson	10 – Horston	4 – Tied	Thompson–Boling Arena (7,552); Knoxville, TN
1/22/2023; 3:00 pm, SECN+		at Missouri	W 68–65	16–6 (8–0)	17 – Puckett	5 – Tied	5 – Powell	Mizzou Arena (5,030); Columbia, MO
1/26/2023*; 8:00 pm, ESPN		No. 5 UConn; Rivalry / College GameDay	L 67–84	16–7	27 – Horston	9 – Hollingshead	5 – Walker	Thompson–Boling Arena (13,804); Knoxville, TN
1/30/2023; 7:00 pm, ESPN2		at No. 3 LSU	L 68–76	16–8 (8–1)	19 – Walker	8 – Jackson	5 – Jackson	Pete Maravich Assembly Center (15,157); Baton Rouge, LA
2/2/2023; 6:30 pm, SECN+		Ole Miss	W 65–51	17–8 (9–1)	20 – Horston	8 – Walker	5 – Horston	Thompson–Boling Arena (7,718); Knoxville, TN
2/6/2023; 7:00 pm, SECN		at Mississippi State	L 90–91 ^{2OT}	17–9 (9–2)	28 – Jackson	12 – Hollingshead	4 – Powell	Humphrey Coliseum (5,512); Starkville, MS
2/12/2023; 2:00 pm, SECN+		Vanderbilt; Rivalry	W 86–59	18–9 (10–2)	21 – Jackson	9 – Horston	8 – Walker	Thompson–Boling Arena (9,224); Knoxville, TN
2/16/2023; 7:00 pm, SECN		at Arkansas	W 87–67	19–9 (11–2)	25 – Jackson	12 – Tied	6 – Horston	Bud Walton Arena (3,243); Fayetteville, AR
2/19/2023; Noon, ESPN2		Auburn	W 83–76	20–9 (12–2)	27 – Jackson	8 – Horston	8 – Powell	Thompson–Boling Arena (9,039); Knoxville, TN
2/23/2023; 7:00 pm, ESPN		No. 1 South Carolina	L 60–73	20–10 (12–3)	21 – Jackson	11 – Horston	3 – Walker	Thompson–Boling Arena (10,296); Knoxville, TN
2/26/2023; 2:00 pm, SECN		at Kentucky; Rivalry	W 83–63	21–10 (13–3)	21 – Jackson	7 – Jackson	8 – Powell	Memorial Coliseum (6,152); Lexington, KY
SEC tournament
3/3/2023; 8:30 pm, SECN	(3)	vs. (14) Kentucky; Quarterfinals / Rivalry	W 80–71	22–10	34 – Jackson	7 – Horston	7 – Horston	Bon Secours Wellness Arena (6,229); Greenville, SC
3/4/2023; 7:00 pm, ESPNU	(3)	vs. (2) No. 4 LSU; Semifinals	W 69–67	23–10	26 – Jackson	10 – Jackson	6 – Walker	Bon Secours Wellness Arena (10,471); Greenville, SC
3/5/2023; 3:00 pm, ESPN	(3)	vs. (1) No. 1 South Carolina; Championship / College GameDay	L 58–74	23–11	19 – Horston	9 – Tied	3 – Horston	Bon Secours Wellness Arena (12,203); Greenville, SC
NCAA tournament
3/18/2023*; 1:00 pm, ABC	(4 S3) No. 24	(13 S3) Saint Louis; First Round	W 95–50	24–11	21 – Horston	8 – Horston	4 – Horston	Thompson–Boling Arena (6,871); Knoxville, TN
3/20/2023*; 6:00 pm, ESPN2	(4 S3) No. 24	(12 S3) Toledo; Second Round	W 94–47	25–11	13 – Tied	10 – Franklin	4 – Jackson	Thompson–Boling Arena (5,486); Knoxville, TN
3/25/2023*; 6:30 pm, ESPN2	(4 S3) No. 24	vs. (1 S1) No. 4 Virginia Tech; Sweet Sixteen	L 64–73	25–12	17 – Horston	8 – Jackson	3 – Tied	Climate Pledge Arena (10,839); Seattle, WA
*Non-conference game. ^{#}Rankings from AP Poll. (#) Tournament seedings in parentheses. S3=Seattle 3. All times are in Eastern Time. 2022–23 Schedule

== Rankings ==
Ranking movements Legend: ██ Increase in ranking ██ Decrease in ranking — = Not ranked RV = Received votes т = Tied with team above or below
	Week																				
Poll	Pre	1	2	3	4	5	6	7	8	9	10	11	12	13	14	15	16	17	18	19	Final
AP	5	5	11	23т	RV	—	—	—	—	RV	—	RV	RV	RV	RV	RV	RV	RV	23	24	Not released
Coaches	4	4	12	24	RV	RV	—	—	—	—	RV	RV	RV	RV	RV	—	—	RV	RV	RV	20
