= 2022–23 Ole Miss Rebels women's basketball team =

Intercollegiate basketball season

2022–23 Ole Miss Rebels women's basketball

NCAA tournament, Sweet Sixteen
- Conference: Southeastern Conference

Ranking
- Coaches: No. 22
- Record: 25–9 (11–5 SEC)
- Head coach: Yolett McPhee-McCuin (5th season)
- Assistant coaches: Chris Ayers; Bojan Jankovic; Jaida Williams
- Home arena: SJB Pavilion

2022–23 SEC women's basketball standings
	Conf.				Overall
Team	W		L	PCT	W		L	PCT
No. 1 South Carolina†	16	–	0	1.000	36	–	1	.973
No. 9 LSU	15	–	1	.938	34	–	2	.944
No. 24 Tennessee	13	–	3	.813	25	–	12	.676
Ole Miss	11	–	5	.688	25	–	9	.735
Mississippi State	9	–	7	.563	22	–	11	.667
Georgia	9	–	7	.563	22	–	12	.647
Alabama	9	–	7	.563	20	–	11	.645
Arkansas	7	–	9	.438	24	–	13	.649
Missouri	6	–	10	.375	18	–	14	.563
Florida	5	–	11	.313	19	–	14	.576
Auburn	5	–	11	.313	16	–	15	.516
Vanderbilt	3	–	13	.188	12	–	19	.387
Kentucky	2	–	14	.125	12	–	19	.387
Texas A&M	2	–	14	.125	9	–	20	.310
† 2023 SEC tournament winner As of April 2, 2023; Rankings from AP poll

The 2022–23 Ole Miss Rebels women's basketball team represented the University of Mississippi during the 2022–23 NCAA Division I women's basketball season. The Rebels, led by fifth-year head coach Yolett McPhee-McCuin, played their home games at The Sandy and John Black Pavilion at Ole Miss and competed as members of the Southeastern Conference (SEC). They finished 25–9 and had near-upsets over LSU on the road and then-No. 1 South Carolina at home (they only lost 64–57 in overtime); they earned the 4th seed in the SEC Tournament, losing to South Carolina in the semifinals by a score of 80–51. The Rebels were selected to the NCAA Tournament in the Seattle regional, defeating Gonzaga 71–48 in the first round. They then advanced to the second round where they had a big upset over 1-seed Stanford, winning 54–49 to advance to the Sweet Sixteen for just the second time in program history (They had previously made it that far in 2007, when Carol Ross coached the team to the Elite Eight). Coincidentally Cleveland would host The Women's Final Four in 2024. They lost to Louisville 72–62 and finished the season ranked #22 in the Coaches Poll.

== Previous season ==
The Rebels finished the season 23–9 (10–6 SEC) and received an at-large bid to the NCAA tournament, where they lost to South Dakota in the First Round.

== Offseason ==
=== Departures ===
Ole Miss Departures
Name	Number	Pos.	Height	Year	Hometown	Notes	Ref
Shakira Austin	0	F	6'5"	Senior	Fredericksburg, VA	Drafted 3rd overall by the Washington Mystics	
Lashonda Monk	1	G	5'6"	RS Senior	Greensboro, NC	Graduated	
Mimi Reid	2	G	5'8"	RS Senior	The Bronx, NY	Transferred to St. John's	
Donnetta Johnson	3	G	5'11"	RS Junior	Queens, NY	Graduated	
Jaiyah Harris-Smith	4	G	5'6"	Freshman	Miami, FL	Transferred to Little Rock	
Iyanla Kitchens	11	F	6'2"	Senior	Lithonia, GA	Graduated	
Aleah Sorrentino	22	F	6'3"	RS Freshman	Palm Bay, FL	Transferred to Lipscomb	
Jacorriah Bracey	23	G	5'10"	Sophomore	Drew, MS	Transferred to Southern Miss	
Tiya Douglas	25	G	5'10"	Junior	Fort Smith, AR	Transferred to Austin Peay	
Caitlin McGee	32	F	6'1"	RS Sophomore	Jacksonville, FL	Transferred to South Florida	
Andeija Puckett	40	C	6'2"	RS Senior	Griffin, GA	Graduated	

=== 2022 recruiting class ===
College recruiting information
Name	Hometown	School	Height	Weight	Commit date
Ayanna Thompson; G	DeSoto, TX	DeSoto High School	6 ft 1 in (1.85 m)	N/A	
Ayanna Thompson; G	Recruit ratings: ESPN: (90)				
Overall recruit ranking:
Note: In many cases, Scout, Rivals, 247Sports, On3, and ESPN may conflict in their listings of height and weight.; In these cases, the average was taken. ESPN grades are on a 100-point scale.; Sources:

=== Incoming transfers ===
Ole Miss incoming transfers
Name	Number	Pos.	Height	Year	Hometown	Previous school
Brooke Moore	0	G	5'7"	Graduate Student	Atlanta, GA	Purdue
Myah Taylor	1	G	5'7"	Graduate Student	Olive Branch, MS	Mississippi State
Marquesha Davis	2	G	6'0"	Senior	McGehee, AR	Arkansas
Tyia Singleton	22	F	6'2"	RS Senior	Winter Haven, FL	Rutgers
Elauna Eaton	23	G	6'0"	RS Sophomore	Helena, AR	Arkansas
Rita Igbokwe	32	C	6'4"	Senior	Jonesboro, GA	Pittsburgh

== Roster ==
2022–23 Ole Miss Rebels women's basketball team
Players
Coaches

Pos.	#	Name	Height	Year	Previous school	Hometown
G	0	Brooke Moore (injured)	5 ft 7 in (1.7 m)	GS	Henry County HS; Purdue	Atlanta, GA
G	1	Myah Taylor	5 ft 7 in (1.7 m)	GS	Olive Branch HS; Mississippi State	Olive Branch, MS
G	2	Marquesha Davis	6 ft 0 in (1.83 m)	Sr	Springdale HS; Arkansas	McGehee, AR
F	5	Snudda Collins	6 ft 1 in (1.85 m)	Jr	Brookhaven HS	Brookhaven, MS
G	10	Destiny Salary	6 ft 0 in (1.83 m)	Jr	Jonesboro HS; Tennessee	Jonesboro, AR
G	12	Jordan Berry	5 ft 7 in (1.7 m)	Sr	Mount Carmel Academy	New Orleans, LA
G	15	Angel Baker	5 ft 8 in (1.73 m)	Sr	Pike HS; Wright State	Indianapolis, IN
G	20	Ayanna Thompson	6 ft 1 in (1.85 m)	Fr	DeSoto HS	DeSoto, TX
F	22	Tyia Singleton	6 ft 2 in (1.88 m)	RS Sr	Winter Haven HS; Rutgers	Winter Haven, FL
G	23	Elauna Eaton	6 ft 0 in (1.83 m)	RS So	Nettleton HS; Arkansas	Helena, AR
F	24	Madison Scott	6 ft 1 in (1.85 m)	Jr	Bishop McNamara HS	Indian Head, MD
C	32	Rita Igbokwe	6 ft 4 in (1.93 m)	Sr	Mundy's Mill HS; Pittsburgh	Jonesboro, GA

Head coach

- Yolett McPhee-McCuin (Rhode Island)

Assistant coach(es)

- Chris Ayers (Florida A&M)
- Bojan Jankovic (Ozarks)
- Jaida Williams (Cal Poly Pomona)

Legend

- (C) Team captain
- (S) Suspended
- (I) Ineligible
- (W) Walk-on
- Injured
- Current redshirt

Roster

== Schedule ==
Date time, TV	Rank^{#}	Opponent^{#}	Result	Record	High points	High rebounds	High assists	Site (attendance) city, state
Exhibition
October 28, 2022*; 6:00 pm		Delta State	W 80−38		–	–	–	SJB Pavilion; Oxford, MS
Non-conference regular season
November 7, 2022*; 5:00 pm, SECN+		Kennesaw State	W 72–60	1–0	18 – Baker	10 – Scott	6 – Taylor	SJB Pavilion; Oxford, MS
November 10, 2022*; 6:00 pm, SECN+		Southeast Missouri State	W 83–57	2–0	14 – Collins	7 – Tied	8 – Taylor	SJB Pavilion (1,945); Oxford, MS
November 13, 2022*; 1:00 pm, ESPN+		at Little Rock	W 58–40	3–0	13 – Davis	10 – Scott	3 – Tied	Jack Stephens Center (3,225); Little Rock, AR
November 16, 2022*; 6:00 pm, SECN+		Southern Miss	W 92–46	4–0	25 – Baker	8 – Scott	5 – Taylor	SJB Pavilion (1,693); Oxford, MS
November 21, 2022*; 7:00 pm, FloSports		vs. Dayton; Pink Flamingo Championship	W 63–50	5-0	14 – Singleton	13 – Singleton	4 – Taylor	Baha Mar Convention Center (573); Nassau, Bahamas
November 23, 2022*; 6:00 pm, FloSports		vs. No. 17 Utah; Pink Flamingo Championship	L 67–69	5–1	18 – Davis	8 – Davis	5 – Taylor	Baha Mar Convention Center; Nassau, Bahamas
November 28, 2022*; 6:00 pm, SECN+		Texas Southern	W 93–47	6–1	16 – Scott	15 – Scott	8 – Taylor	SJB Pavilion (1,769); Oxford, MS
November 29, 2022*; 6:00 pm, SECN+		Alabama A&M	W 74–28	7–1	22 – Collins	10 – Scott	8 – Salary	SJB Pavilion (1,572); Oxford, MS
December 4, 2022*; 2:00 pm, ESPN+		at Oklahoma	L 59–69	7–2	22 – Baker	9 – Baker	5 – Taylor	Lloyd Noble Center (3,285); Norman, OK
December 11, 2022*; 1:00 pm, SECN		Jacksonville State	W 74–54	8–2	18 – Baker	11 – Singleton	5 – Tied	SJB Pavilion (1,961); Oxford, MS
December 14, 2022*; 11:00 am, SECN+		Jacksonville	W 66–52	9–2	19 – Scott	17 – Scott	3 – Salary	SJB Pavilion (8,958); Oxford, MS
December 17, 2022*; 12:00 pm, SECN+		McNeese	W 79–60	10–2	18 – Scott	10 – Scott	5 – Scott	SJB Pavilion (1,591); Oxford, MS
December 21, 2022*; 11:00 am, ESPN+		at Temple	W 75–55	11–2	16 – Tied	10 – Tied	5 – Tied	Liacouras Center (1,502); Philadelphia, PA
SEC regular season
December 29, 2022; 6:00 pm, SECN+		Auburn	W 79–47	12–2 (1–0)	18 – Baker	10 – Salary	5 – Taylor	SJB Pavilion (2,369); Oxford, MS
January 1, 2023; 5:00 pm, SECN		at Mississippi State	W 61–50	13–2 (2–0)	22 – Baker	10 – Baker	4 – Collins	Humphrey Coliseum (6,023); Starkville, MS
January 5, 2023; 6:00 pm, SECN+		Vanderbilt	W 74–53	14–2 (3–0)	22 – Baker	9 – Scott	3 – Tied	SJB Pavilion (2,235); Oxford, MS
January 8, 2023; 2:00 pm, SECN		at Texas A&M	W 57–38	15–2 (4–0)	11 – Tied	8 – Scott	8 – Baker	Reed Arena (4,064); College Station, TX
January 12, 2023; 6:00 pm, SECN+		at Georgia	W 66–58	16–2 (5–0)	20 – Baker	7 – Tied	8 – Taylor	Stegeman Coliseum (1,922); Athens, GA
January 15, 2023; 4:00 pm, SECN		Alabama	L 58–63	16–3 (5–1)	16 – Salary	14 – Scott	3 – Scott	SJB Pavilion (3,630); Oxford, MS
January 22, 2023; 4:00 pm, SECN		at Auburn	L 76–77 ^{OT}	16–4 (5–2)	25 – Baker	12 – Baker	2 – Davis	Neville Arena (3,093); Auburn, AL
January 26, 2023; 8:00 pm, SECN		Mississippi State	W 78–63	17–4 (6–2)	17 – Baker	7 – Tied	6 – Tied	SJB Pavilion (3,596); Oxford, MS
January 29, 2023; 4:00 pm, SECN		at Arkansas	W 76–73 ^{OT}	18–4 (7–2)	20 – Davis	12 – Scott	3 – Tied	Bud Walton Arena (6,677); Fayetteville, AR
February 2, 2023; 5:30 pm, SECN+		at Tennessee	L 51–65	18–5 (7–3)	14 – Baker	10 – Davis	3 – Taylor	Thompson–Boling Arena (7,718); Knoxville, TN
February 5, 2023; 3:00 pm, ESPNU		Florida	W 68–42	19–5 (8–3)	18 – Baker	11 – Igbokwe	6 – Taylor	SJB Pavilion (3,216); Oxford, MS
February 13, 2023; 6:00 pm, SECN		Kentucky	W 74–52	20–5 (9–3)	14 – Davis	12 – Scott	6 – Baker	SJB Pavilion (2,391); Oxford, MS
February 16, 2023; 8:00 pm, SECN		at No. 5 LSU	L 60–69	20–6 (9–4)	21 – Baker	9 – Igbokwe	3 – Baker	Pete Maravich Assembly Center (8,753); Baton Rouge, LA
February 19, 2023; 3:00 pm, SECN		No. 1 South Carolina	L 57–64 ^{OT}	20–7 (9–5)	17 – Baker	7 – Davis	4 – Taylor	SJB Pavilion (6,563); Oxford, MS
February 23, 2023; 6:00 pm, SECN+		Missouri	W 72–64	21–7 (10–5)	19 – Baker	10 – Scott	6 – Baker	SJB Pavilion (2,441); Oxford, MS
February 26, 2023; 2:00 pm, SECN+		at Alabama	W 57–55	22–7 (11–5)	26 – Davis	10 – Igbokwe	4 – Baker	Coleman Coliseum (2,707); Tuscaloosa, AL
SEC Tournament
March 3, 2023; 1:25 pm, SECN	(4)	vs. (13) Texas A&M; Quarterfinals	W 77–60	23–7	23 – Baker	8 – Scott	4 – Scott	Bon Secours Wellness Arena; Greenville, SC
March 4, 2023; 3:30 pm, ESPNU	(4)	vs. (1) No. 1 South Carolina; Semifinals	L 51–80	23–8	15 – Scott	7 – Baker	5 – Taylor	Bon Secours Wellness Arena; Greenville, SC
NCAA Tournament
March 17, 2023; 9:00 pm, ESPNU	(8 S4)	vs. (9 S4) No. 19 Gonzaga; First round	W 71–48	24–8	15 – Collins	9 – Scott	4 – Taylor	Maples Pavilion (4,020); Stanford, CA
March 19, 2023; 8:30 pm, ESPN	(8 S4)	at (1 S4) No. 5 Stanford; Second round	W 54–49	25–8	13 – Baker	8 – Igbokwe	2 – Tied	Maples Pavilion (5,361); Stanford, CA
March 24, 2023; 9:00 pm, ESPN	(8 S4)	vs. (5 S4) Louisville; Sweet Sixteen	L 62–72	25–9	19 – Tied	8 – Davis	3 – Davis	Climate Pledge Arena (9,626); Seattle, WA
*Non-conference game. ^{#}Rankings from AP Poll. (#) Tournament seedings in parentheses. S4=Seattle 4 Region. All times are in Central Time.

== Rankings ==
Ranking movements Legend: ██ Increase in ranking ██ Decrease in ranking — = Not ranked RV = Received votes
	Week																				
Poll	Pre	1	2	3	4	5	6	7	8	9	10	11	12	13	14	15	16	17	18	19	Final
AP	RV	RV	RV	RV	—	—	—														Not released
Coaches	RV	RV	—	—	—	—															22

== See also ==
- 2022–23 Ole Miss Rebels men's basketball team
