= 2022–23 Mississippi State Bulldogs women's basketball team =

American college basketball season

2022–23 Mississippi State Bulldogs women's basketball

NCAA tournament, Round of 32
- Conference: Southeastern Conference
- Record: 22–11 (9–7 SEC)
- Head coach: Sam Purcell (1st season)
- Assistant coaches: Murriel Page; Corry Irvin; Gabe Lazo
- Home arena: Humphrey Coliseum

2022–23 SEC women's basketball standings
	Conf.				Overall
Team	W		L	PCT	W		L	PCT
No. 1 South Carolina†	16	–	0	1.000	36	–	1	.973
No. 9 LSU	15	–	1	.938	34	–	2	.944
No. 24 Tennessee	13	–	3	.813	25	–	12	.676
Ole Miss	11	–	5	.688	25	–	9	.735
Mississippi State	9	–	7	.563	22	–	11	.667
Georgia	9	–	7	.563	22	–	12	.647
Alabama	9	–	7	.563	20	–	11	.645
Arkansas	7	–	9	.438	24	–	13	.649
Missouri	6	–	10	.375	18	–	14	.563
Florida	5	–	11	.313	19	–	14	.576
Auburn	5	–	11	.313	16	–	15	.516
Vanderbilt	3	–	13	.188	12	–	19	.387
Kentucky	2	–	14	.125	12	–	19	.387
Texas A&M	2	–	14	.125	9	–	20	.310
† 2023 SEC tournament winner As of April 2, 2023; Rankings from AP poll

The 2022–23 Mississippi State Bulldogs women's basketball team represented Mississippi State University in the 2022–23 college basketball season. Led by first-year head coach Sam Purcell, the team played their home games at Humphrey Coliseum in Starkville, Mississippi and were members of the Southeastern Conference (SEC).

The Bulldogs finished the season 22–11 (9–7 SEC) to finish in a tie for fifth place in the conference. They received an at-large bid to the NCAA tournament, where they defeated Illinois in the First Four and Creighton in the first round before falling to Notre Dame in the second round.

== Offseason ==
=== Departures ===
Mississippi State departures
Name	Number	Pos.	Height	Year	Hometown	Notes
Myah Taylor	1	G	5' 7"	Senior	Olive Branch, MS	Transferred to Ole Miss
Jasmine Shavers	3	G	5' 9"	Freshman	Mesquite, TX	Transferred to Texas Tech
Rickea Jackson	5	F	6' 2"	Junior	Detroit, MI	Transferred to Tennessee
Kn'isha Godfrey	11	G	5' 9"	Freshman	Tampa, FL	Transferred to TCU
Caterrion Thompson	23	G	5' 11"	RS Senior	Lima, OH	Graduated
Ashley Jones	24	G	5' 7"	RS Junior	Philadelphia, PA	Transferred to Southern Illinois
Raven Farley	44	F	6' 4"	RS Senior	Elizabeth, NJ	Graduated

=== 2022 recruiting class ===
College recruiting information
Name	Hometown	School	Height	Weight	Commit date
Debreasha Powe; G/F	Meridian, MS	Meridian HS	6 ft 1 in (1.85 m)	N/A	
Debreasha Powe; G/F	Recruit ratings: ESPN: (91)				
Aniya Palmer; G/F	LaGrange, GA	Troup County HS	6 ft 0 in (1.83 m)	N/A	
Aniya Palmer; G/F	Recruit ratings: No ratings found				
Overall recruit ranking:
Note: In many cases, Scout, Rivals, 247Sports, On3, and ESPN may conflict in their listings of height and weight.; In these cases, the average was taken. ESPN grades are on a 100-point scale.; Sources:

=== Incoming transfers ===
Mississippi State incoming transfers
Name	Number	Pos.	Height	Year	Hometown	Previous school
Ahlana Smith	1	G	5' 9"	Graduate student	Charlotte, NC	Louisville
Asaianae Smith	2	G	5' 8"	Graduate student	Brooklyn, NY	St. Bonaventure
Kourtney Weber	11	G	5' 10"	Graduate student	New Orleans, LA	Florida State
Ramani Parker	23	F	6' 4"	Junior	Fresno, CA	Louisville
Nyayongah Gony	24	F	6' 4"	RS Sophomore	Lincoln, NE	Miami (FL)

== Roster ==
2022–23 Mississippi State Bulldogs women's basketball team
Players
Coaches

Pos.	#	Name	Height	Year	Previous school	Hometown
G	0	Anastasia Hayes	5 ft 7 in (1.7 m)	GS	Riverdale HS; Middle Tennessee	Murfreesboro, TN
G	1	Ahlana Smith	5 ft 9 in (1.75 m)	GS	Mallard Creek HS; Louisville	Charlotte, NC
G	2	JerKaila Jordan	5 ft 9 in (1.75 m)	Jr	John Curtis Christian School; Tulane	New Orleans, LA
G	3	Asianae Johnson	5 ft 8 in (1.73 m)	GS	Grand St. Campus HS; St. Bonaventure	Brooklyn, NY
F/C	4	Jessika Carter	6 ft 5 in (1.96 m)	RS Sr	Harris County HS	Waverly Hall, GA
G	5	Alasia Hayes	5 ft 8 in (1.73 m)	RS So	Riverdale HS; Notre Dame	Murfreesboro, TN
G	10	Aislynn Hayes	5 ft 6 in (1.68 m)	Sr	Riverdale HS; Middle Tennessee	Murfreesboro, TN
G	11	Kourtney Weber	5 ft 10 in (1.78 m)	GS	Ursuline Academy; Florida State	New Orleans, LA
G	12	Mia Moore	5 ft 6 in (1.68 m)	RS Fr	St. Francis HS	Alpharetta, GA
G/F	15	Aniya Palmer	6 ft 0 in (1.83 m)	Fr	Troup County HS	LaGrange, GA
G/F	21	Debreasha Powe	6 ft 1 in (1.85 m)	Fr	Meridian HS	Meridian, MS
C	22	Charlotte Kohl	6 ft 5 in (1.96 m)	Jr	Theo Koch Schule	Giessen, Germany
F	23	Ramani Parker	6 ft 4 in (1.93 m)	Jr	Montverde Academy; Louisville	Fresno, CA
F	24	Nyayongah Gony	6 ft 4 in (1.93 m)	RS So	Lincoln HS; Miami (FL)	Lincoln, NE
F	25	Denae Carter	6 ft 0 in (1.83 m)	So	St. Basil Academy	Philadelphia, PA

Head coach

- Sam Purcell (Auburn)

Assistant coach(es)

- Corry Irvin (Fresno State)
- Gabe Lazo (Barry)
- Murriel Page (Florida)

Legend

- (C) Team captain
- (S) Suspended
- (I) Ineligible
- (W) Walk-on
- Injured
- Current redshirt

Roster
Last update: October 21, 2025

== Schedule and results ==
Date time, TV	Rank^{#}	Opponent^{#}	Result	Record	Site (attendance) city, state
Non-conference regular season
November 9, 2022*; 7:00 p.m., SECN+		Mississippi Valley State	W 104–47	1–0	Humphrey Coliseum (4,762); Starkville, MS
November 11, 2022*; 5:30 p.m., SECN+		North Alabama	W 77–40	2–0	Humphrey Coliseum (5,320); Starkville, MS
November 14, 2022*; 6:00 p.m., Midco Sports		at South Dakota State	L 62–63	2–1	Frost Arena (1,787); Brookings, SD
November 18, 2022*; 7:00 p.m., SECN+		Alabama State	W 81–46	3–1	Humphrey Coliseum (4,786); Starkville, MS
November 20, 2022*; 3:00 p.m., SECN+		Colorado State	W 71–66	4–1	Humphrey Coliseum (4,678); Starkville, MS
November 25, 2022*; 11:00 a.m., FloSports		vs. Georgetown; Puerto Rico Clasico	W 67–32	5–1	Roberto Clemente Coliseum (100); San Juan, Puerto Rico
November 26, 2022*; 1:30 p.m., FloSports		vs. Nebraska; Puerto Rico Clasico	L 65–73 ^{OT}	5–2	Roberto Clemente Coliseum (100); San Juan, Puerto Rico
November 29, 2022*; 7:00 p.m., SECN+		Louisiana–Monroe	W 94–39	6–2	Humphrey Coliseum (4,416); Starkville, MS
December 4, 2022*; 3:00 p.m., SECN+		Grambling State	W 73–47	7–2	Humphrey Coliseum (4,537); Starkville, MS
December 11, 2022*; 5:00 p.m., SECN+		Texas A&M–Commerce	W 88–53	8–2	Humphrey Coliseum (4,917); Starkville, MS
December 15, 2022*; 7:00 p.m., SECN+		Florida A&M	W 72–47	9–2	Humphrey Coliseum (4,350); Starkville, MS
December 19, 2022*; 7:00 p.m., BallerTV		vs. Old Dominion; Sun Coast Challenge	W 83–47	10–2	Pasco–Hernando State College (135); Tampa, FL
December 21, 2022*; 12:00 p.m., BallerTV		vs. New Mexico; Sun Coast Challenge	W 87–58	11–2	Pasco–Hernando State College (95); Tampa, FL
SEC regular season
December 29, 2022; 5:00 p.m., SECN+		at Vanderbilt	W 72–44	12–2 (1–0)	Memorial Gymnasium (2,456); Nashville, TN
January 1, 2023; 5:00 p.m., SECN		Ole Miss	L 50–61	12–3 (1–1)	Humphrey Coliseum (6,023); Starkville, MS
January 5, 2023; 5:30 p.m., SECN+		at Tennessee	L 69–80	12–4 (1–2)	Thompson–Boling Arena (7,428); Knoxville, TN
January 8, 2023; 12:00 p.m., ESPN2		No. 1 South Carolina	L 51–58	12–5 (1–3)	Humphrey Coliseum (5,776); Starkville, MS
January 15, 2023; 2:00 p.m., SECN+		at Texas A&M	W 60–44	13–5 (2–3)	Reed Arena (4,162); College Station, TX
January 19, 2023; 7:00 p.m., SECN+		Auburn	W 72–58	14–5 (3–3)	Humphrey Coliseum (5,221); Starkville, MS
January 22, 2023; 12:00 p.m., SECN		Kentucky	W 77–76	15–5 (4–3)	Humphrey Coliseum (5,130); Starkville, MS
January 26, 2023; 8:00 p.m., SECN		at Ole Miss	L 63–78	15–6 (4–4)	SJB Pavilion (3,596); Oxford, MS
January 29, 2023; 1:00 p.m., SECN+		at Georgia	L 34–62	15–7 (4–5)	Stegeman Coliseum (3,852); Athens, GA
February 6, 2023; 6:00 p.m., SECN		Tennessee	W 91–90 ^{2OT}	16–7 (5–5)	Humphrey Coliseum (5,512); Starkville, MS
February 9, 2023; 6:00 p.m., SECN		at Florida	W 73–56	17–7 (6–5)	O'Connell Center (1,170); Gainesville, FL
February 12, 2023; 2:00 p.m., SECN		Texas A&M	W 70–62	18–7 (7–5)	Humphrey Coliseum (5,163); Starkville, MS
February 16, 2023; 7:00 p.m., SECN+		at Missouri	L 62–75	18–8 (7–6)	Mizzou Arena (2,698); Columbia, MO
February 19, 2023; 4:30 p.m., SECN+		Alabama	W 60–45	19–8 (8–6)	Humphrey Coliseum (6,011); Starkville, MS
February 23, 2023; 8:00 p.m., SECN		Arkansas	W 87–73	20–8 (9–6)	Humphrey Coliseum (4,940); Starkville, MS
February 26, 2023; 5:00 p.m., SECN		at No. 5 LSU	L 59–74	20–9 (9–7)	Pete Maravich Assembly Center (15,721); Baton Rouge, LA
SEC tournament
March 2, 2023; 1:30 p.m., SECN	(5)	vs. (13) Texas A&M; Second Round	L 72–79	20–10	Bon Secours Wellness Arena (5,531); Greenville, SC
NCAA tournament
March 15, 2023*; 6:00 p.m., ESPNU	(11 G1)	vs. (11 G1) Illinois; First Four	W 70–56	21–10	Edmund P. Joyce Center (466); South Bend, IN
March 17, 2023*; 5:00 p.m., ESPNews	(11 G1)	vs. (6 G1) Creighton; Round of 64	W 81–66	22–10	Edmund P. Joyce Center (3,950); South Bend, IN
March 19, 2023*; 2:30 p.m., ESPN	(11 G1)	at (3 G1) No. 10 Notre Dame; Round of 32	L 48–53	22–11	Edmund P. Joyce Center (4,565); South Bend, IN
*Non-conference game. ^{#}Rankings from AP poll. (#) Tournament seedings in parentheses. G1=Greenville 1. All times are in Central.

== See also ==
- 2022–23 Mississippi State Bulldogs men's basketball team
