= 2022–23 Missouri Tigers women's basketball team =

American college basketball season

2022–23 Missouri Tigers women's basketball

WNIT, Second Round
- Conference: Southeastern Conference
- Record: 18–14 (6–10 SEC)
- Head coach: Robin Pingeton (13th season)
- Assistant coaches: Jenny Putnam (13th season); Chris Bracey (5th season); Jasmine James (1st season)
- Home arena: Mizzou Arena

2022–23 SEC women's basketball standings
	Conf.				Overall
Team	W		L	PCT	W		L	PCT
No. 1 South Carolina†	16	–	0	1.000	36	–	1	.973
No. 9 LSU	15	–	1	.938	34	–	2	.944
No. 24 Tennessee	13	–	3	.813	25	–	12	.676
Ole Miss	11	–	5	.688	25	–	9	.735
Mississippi State	9	–	7	.563	22	–	11	.667
Georgia	9	–	7	.563	22	–	12	.647
Alabama	9	–	7	.563	20	–	11	.645
Arkansas	7	–	9	.438	24	–	13	.649
Missouri	6	–	10	.375	18	–	14	.563
Florida	5	–	11	.313	19	–	14	.576
Auburn	5	–	11	.313	16	–	15	.516
Vanderbilt	3	–	13	.188	12	–	19	.387
Kentucky	2	–	14	.125	12	–	19	.387
Texas A&M	2	–	14	.125	9	–	20	.310
† 2023 SEC tournament winner As of April 2, 2023; Rankings from AP poll

The 2022–23 Missouri Tigers women's basketball team represented the University of Missouri in the 2022–23 college basketball season. Led by thirteenth year head coach Robin Pingeton, the team played their games at Mizzou Arena and were members of the Southeastern Conference.

== Previous season ==
The Tigers finished the season 18–13 (18–13 SEC) to finish eighth place in the conference. The Tigers were invited to the 2022 Women's National Invitation Tournament where they lost to Drake in the first round.

== Offseason ==
=== Departures ===
Missouri Departures
Name	Number	Pos.	Height	Year	Hometown	Notes
LaDazhia Williams	0	F	6'4"	RS-Senior	Bradenton, FL	Transferred to LSU
Aijha Blackwell	33	G	6'0"	Junior	Berkeley, MO	Transferred to Baylor
Kiya Dorroh	24	F	6'1"	Freshman	Tucson, AZ	Transferred to Colorado State
Izzy Higginbottom	30	G	5'7"	Freshman	Batesville, AR	Transferred to Arkansas State

=== 2022 Recruiting Class ===
College recruiting
Name	Hometown	School	Height	Weight	Commit date
Averi Kroenke; G	Columbia, MO	Rock Bridge High School	5 ft 10 in (1.78 m)	N/A	
Averi Kroenke; G	Recruit ratings: ESPN: (92)				
Averi Judd; G	West Plains, MO	West Plains High School	6 ft 1 in (1.85 m)	N/A	
Averi Judd; G	Recruit ratings: No ratings found				
Overall recruit ranking:
Note: In many cases, Scout, Rivals, 247Sports, On3, and ESPN may conflict in their listings of height and weight.; In these cases, the average was taken. ESPN grades are on a 100-point scale.; Sources:

=== Incoming transfers ===
Transfers
Name	Number	Pos.	Height	Year	Hometown	Notes
Katlyn Gilbert	10	G	5'10"	Graduate Student	Indianapolis, IN	Transferred from Notre Dame

== Roster ==
2022–23 Missouri Tigers women's basketball team
Players
Coaches

Pos.	#	Name	Height	Year	Previous school	Hometown
G	1	Lauren Hansen	5 ft 8 in (1.73 m)	Sr	Ward Melville High School; Auburn	Long Island, NY
G	2	Sara-Rose Smith	6 ft 1 in (1.85 m)	Jr	BA Centre of Excellence	Melbourne, Australia
G	4	Mama Dembele	5 ft 6 in (1.68 m)	Jr	IES Joaquim Blume	Manlleu, Spain
G	10	Katlyn Gilbert	5 ft 10 in (1.78 m)	GS	Heritage Christian School; Notre Dame	Indianapolis, IN
G	13	Haley Troup	5 ft 10 in (1.78 m)	GS	Gadsden City High School	Gadsden, AL
F	20	Sarah Linthacum	6 ft 3 in (1.91 m)	So	Jefferson City High School	Jefferson City, MO
G	21	Averi Kroenke	5 ft 11 in (1.8 m)	Fr	Rock Bridge High School	Columbia, MO
G	24	Ashton Judd	6 ft 1 in (1.85 m)	Fr	West Plains High School	West Plains, MO
C	32	Jayla Kelly	6 ft 3 in (1.91 m)	Jr	Parkway Central HS	Chesterfield, MO
F	34	Da'Necia Trusty	6 ft 3 in (1.91 m)	RS Fr	Alief Hastings HS	Houston, TX
F	40	Micah Linthacum	6 ft 4 in (1.93 m)	RS Jr	Jefferson City HS	Jefferson City, MO
F	43	Hayley Frank	6 ft 1 in (1.85 m)	Sr	Strafford HS	Strafford, MO

Head coach

- Robin Pingeton (St. Ambrose)

Assistant coach(es)

- Jenny Putnam (St. Ambrose)
- Chris Bracey (West Texas A&M)
- Jasmine James (Georgia)

Legend

- (C) Team captain
- (S) Suspended
- (I) Ineligible
- (W) Walk-on
- Injured
- Current redshirt

Roster

== Schedule and results ==
Date time, TV	Rank^{#}	Opponent^{#}	Result	Record	Site (attendance) city, state
Exhibition
October 26, 2022*; 7:00 p.m.		Northwest Missouri State	W 70−27		Mizzou Arena (527); Columbia, MO
November 1, 2022*; 7:00 p.m.		Rogers State	Canceled		Mizzou Arena; Columbia, MO
Non-conference regular season
November 7, 2022*; 6:00 p.m., ESPN+		at Missouri State	W 68–51	1–0	Great Southern Bank Arena (3,586); Springfield, MO
November 10, 2022*; 7:00 p.m., SECN+		Bradley	W 83–38	2–0	Mizzou Arena; Columbia, MO
November 13, 2022*; 1:00 p.m., SECN+		Southeast Missouri State	W 62–50	3–0	Mizzou Arena (2,693); Columbia, MO
November 14, 2022*; 7:00 p.m., SECN+		Western Kentucky	W 65–47	4–0	Mizzou Arena (2,530); Columbia, MO
November 17, 2022*; 7:00 p.m., SECN+		UT Martin	W 60–55	5–0	Mizzou Arena (2,107); Columbia, MO
November 21, 2022*; 4:30 p.m., FloSports		vs. Wake Forest; Baha Mar Hoops Pink Flamingo Championship	W 69–47	6–0	Baha Mar Convention Center; Nassau, Bahamas
November 23, 2022*; 12:30 p.m., FloSports		vs. No. 11 Virginia Tech; Baha Mar Hoops Pink Flamingo Championship	L 57–73	6–1	Baha Mar Convention Center; Nassau, Bahamas
November 30, 2022*; 7:00 p.m., SECN+		Saint Louis	W 82–52	7–1	Mizzou Arena; Columbia, MO
December 3, 2022*; 5:00 p.m.		vs. UMass; Arizona State Classic	W 71–66	8–1	Desert Financial Arena (262); Tempe, AZ
December 4, 2022*; 2:30 p.m.		at Arizona State; Arizona State Classic	W 71–60	9–1	Desert Financial Arena (3,221); Tempe, AZ
December 9, 2022*; 11:30 a.m., SECN+		Omaha	W 83–36	10–1	Mizzou Arena; Columbia, MO
December 11, 2022*; 2:00 p.m., SECN+		Jackson State	W 74–61	11–1	Mizzou Arena (2,744); Columbia, MO
December 18, 2022*; 4:00 p.m., SECN+		Illinois	L 66–76	11–2	Mizzou Arena (2,963); Columbia, MO
SEC regular season
December 29, 2022; 8:00 p.m., SECN		Kentucky	W 74–71	12–2 (1–0)	Mizzou Arena (3,258); Columbia, MO
January 1, 2023; 3:00 p.m., SECN		at Auburn	W 62–56	13–2 (2–0)	Neville Arena (2,131); Auburn, AL
January 5, 2023; 6:00 p.m., SECN+		at Alabama	W 66–65	14–2 (3–0)	Coleman Coliseum (1,800); Tuscaloosa, AL
January 8, 2023; 2:00 p.m., SECN+		Arkansas	L 55–77	14–3 (3–1)	Mizzou Arena (4,260); Columbia, MO
January 12, 2023; 6:00 p.m., SECN		No. 5 LSU	L 57–77	14–4 (3–2)	Mizzou Arena (2,791); Columbia, MO
January 15, 2023; 12:00 p.m., ESPN		at No. 1 South Carolina	L 50–81	14–5 (3–3)	Colonial Life Arena (15,444); Columbia, SC
January 22, 2023; 2:00 p.m., SECN+		Tennessee	L 65–68	14–6 (3–4)	Mizzou Arena (5,030); Columbia, MO
January 26, 2023; 6:00 p.m., SEC+		at Georgia	L 51-62	14–7 (3–5)	Stegeman Coliseum (2,029); Athens, GA
January 29, 2023; 2:00 p.m., SECN		at Kentucky	L 54-77	14–8 (3–6)	Memorial Coliseum (3,914); Lexington, KY
February 2, 2023; 8:00 p.m., SECN		Vanderbilt	W 86-69	15–8 (4–6)	Mizzou Arena (2,523); Columbia, MO
February 5, 2023; 4:00 p.m., SECN		Alabama	L 69-76	15–9 (4–7)	Mizzou Arena (3,698); Columbia, MO
February 12, 2023; 2:00 p.m., SECN+		at Arkansas	L 33–61	15–10 (4–8)	Bud Walton Arena (4,492); Fayetteville, AR
February 16, 2023; 7:00 p.m., SECN+		Mississippi State	W 75–62	16–10 (5–8)	Mizzou Arena (2,698); Columbia, MO
February 20, 2023; 6:00 p.m., SECN		at Texas A&M	W 61–35	17–10 (6–8)	Reed Arena (3,446); College Station, TX
February 23, 2023; 6:00 p.m., SECN+		at Ole Miss	L 64–72	17–11 (6–9)	SJB Pavilion (2,441); Oxford, MS
February 26, 2023; 2:00 p.m., SECN+		Florida	L 52–61	17–12 (6–10)	Mizzou Arena (4,556); Columbia, MO
SEC Tournament
March 2, 2023; 11:00 a.m., SECN	(9)	vs. (8) Arkansas; Second Round	L 74–85	17–13	Bon Secours Wellness Arena (5,531); Greenville, SC
WNIT
March 16, 2023; 7:00 pm, SECN+		Illinois State; First Round	W 61–51	18–13	Mizzou Arena; Columbia, MO
March 20, 2023; 6:30 pm, ESPN+		at Kansas; Second Round/Border War	L 47–75	18–14	Allen Fieldhouse (3,682); Lawrence, KS
*Non-conference game. ^{#}Rankings from AP Poll. (#) Tournament seedings in parentheses. All times are in Central.

== Rankings ==
Ranking movements Legend: ██ Increase in ranking ██ Decrease in ranking — = Not ranked RV = Received votes
	Week																				
Poll	Pre	1	2	3	4	5	6	7	8	9	10	11	12	13	14	15	16	17	18	19	Final
AP	—	—	—	—	—	RV	RV														Not released
Coaches	—	—	—	—	—	—															

== See also ==
- 2022–23 Missouri Tigers men's basketball team
