= 2022–23 Texas A&M Aggies women's basketball team =

American college basketball season

2022–23 Texas A&M Aggies women's basketball
- Conference: Southeastern Conference
- Record: 9–20 (2–14 SEC)
- Head coach: Joni Taylor (1st season)
- Associate head coach: Chelsea Newton
- Assistant coaches: Robert Mosley; Katherine Graham
- Home arena: Reed Arena

2022–23 SEC women's basketball standings
	Conf.				Overall
Team	W		L	PCT	W		L	PCT
No. 1 South Carolina†	16	–	0	1.000	36	–	1	.973
No. 9 LSU	15	–	1	.938	34	–	2	.944
No. 24 Tennessee	13	–	3	.813	25	–	12	.676
Ole Miss	11	–	5	.688	25	–	9	.735
Mississippi State	9	–	7	.563	22	–	11	.667
Georgia	9	–	7	.563	22	–	12	.647
Alabama	9	–	7	.563	20	–	11	.645
Arkansas	7	–	9	.438	24	–	13	.649
Missouri	6	–	10	.375	18	–	14	.563
Florida	5	–	11	.313	19	–	14	.576
Auburn	5	–	11	.313	16	–	15	.516
Vanderbilt	3	–	13	.188	12	–	19	.387
Kentucky	2	–	14	.125	12	–	19	.387
Texas A&M	2	–	14	.125	9	–	20	.310
† 2023 SEC tournament winner As of April 2, 2023; Rankings from AP poll

The 2022–23 Texas A&M Aggies women's basketball team represented the Texas A&M University in the 2022–23 college basketball season. Led by first-year head coach Joni Taylor, the team played their games at Reed Arena and were members of the Southeastern Conference.

== Schedule and results ==
Date time, TV	Rank^{#}	Opponent^{#}	Result	Record	Site (attendance) city, state
Non-conference regular season
November 10, 2022*; 7:00 p.m., SECN+		Texas A&M–Corpus Christi	W 69–45	1–0	Reed Arena (3,085); College Station, TX
November 13, 2022*; 2:00 p.m., SECN+		Army	W 73–49	2–0	Reed Arena (2,856); College Station, TX
November 17, 2022*; 6:00 p.m., ACCNX		at Duke	L 52–71	2–1	Cameron Indoor Stadium (1,352); Durham, NC
November 20, 2022*; 2:00 p.m., SECN+		Texas Southern	W 67–54	3–1	Reed Arena (2,964); College Station, TX
November 23, 2022*; 4:00 p.m., SECN+		Texas State	W 67–46	4–1	Reed Arena (2,883); College Station, TX
November 27, 2022*; 2:00 p.m., SECN+		Rice	L 58–66	4–2	Reed Arena (3,021); College Station, TX
November 30, 2022*; 7:00 p.m., ESPN+		at Kansas	L 42–74	4–3	Allen Fieldhouse (2,165); Lawrence, KS
December 4, 2022*; 2:00 p.m.		Morgan State	Canceled		Reed Arena; College Station, TX
December 6, 2022*; 6:30 p.m., ESPN+		at Little Rock	L 38–42	4–4	Jack Stephens Center (1,631); Little Rock, AR
December 18, 2022*; 2:00 p.m., SECN+		SMU	W 57–49	5–4	Reed Arena; College Station, TX
December 21, 2022*; 5:45 p.m., SECN+		Purdue	L 53–59	5–5	Reed Arena (1,608); College Station, TX
SEC regular season
December 29, 2022; 6:00 p.m., SECN		at No. 1 South Carolina	L 34–76	5–6 (0–1)	Colonial Life Arena (13,003); Columbia, SC
January 1, 2023; 1:00 p.m., SECN		Florida	L 48–55	5–7 (0–2)	Reed Arena (3,255); College Station, TX
January 5, 2023; 8:00 p.m., SECN		at No. 7 LSU	L 34–74	5–8 (0–3)	Pete Maravich Assembly Center (6,549); Baton Rouge, LA
January 8, 2023; 2:00 p.m., SECN		Ole Miss	L 38–57	5–9 (0–4)	Reed Arena (4,064); College Station, TX
January 12, 2023; 8:00 p.m., SECN		Tennessee	L 50–62	5–10 (0–5)	Reed Arena (3,222); College Station, TX
January 15, 2023; 2:00 p.m., SECN+		Mississippi State	L 44–60	5–11 (0–6)	Reed Arena (4,162); College Station, TX
January 19, 2023; 6:00 p.m., SECN+		at Alabama	L 46–61	5–12 (0–7)	Coleman Coliseum (2,201); Tuscaloosa, AL
January 22, 2023; 2:00 p.m., SECN		Georgia	W 75–73	6–12 (1–7)	Reed Arena (3,591); College Station, TX
January 29, 2023; 12:00 p.m., SECN		at Vanderbilt	L 79–88	6–13 (1–8)	Memorial Gymnasium (2,376); Nashville, TN
February 2, 2023; 5:00 p.m., SECN+		at Florida	L 54–61	6–14 (1–9)	O'Connell Center (2,099); Gainesville, FL
February 5, 2023; 1:00 p.m., ESPN2		No. 3 LSU	L 66–72	6–15 (1–10)	Reed Arena (6,482); College Station, TX
February 12, 2023; 2:00 p.m., SECN		at Mississippi State	L 62–70	6–16 (1–11)	Humphrey Coliseum (5,163); Starkville, MS
February 16, 2023; 7:00 p.m., SECN+		at Auburn	L 55–65	6–17 (1–12)	Neville Arena (2,293); Auburn, AL
February 20, 2023; 6:00 p.m., SECN		Missouri	L 35–61	6–18 (1–13)	Reed Arena (3,446); College Station, TX
February 23, 2023; 6:00 p.m., SECN		Kentucky	W 74–67	7–18 (2–13)	Reed Arena (2,795); College Station, TX
February 26, 2023; 11:00 a.m., SECN		at Arkansas	L 65–78	7–19 (2–14)	Bud Walton Arena (4,408); Fayetteville, AR
SEC Tournament
March 1, 2023; 10:00 a.m., SECN	(13)	vs. (12) Vanderbilt; First Round	W 77–70	8–19	Bon Secours Wellness Arena (8,125); Greenville, SC
March 2, 2023; 1:00 p.m., SECN	(13)	vs. (5) Mississippi State; Second Round	W 79–72	9–19	Bon Secours Wellness Arena (5,531); Greenville, SC
March 3, 2023; 1:30 p.m., SECN	(13)	vs. (4) Ole Miss; Quarterfinals	L 60–77	9–20	Bon Secours Wellness Arena (7,481); Greenville, SC
*Non-conference game. ^{#}Rankings from AP Poll. (#) Tournament seedings in parentheses. All times are in Central.

== Rankings ==
Ranking movements Legend: ██ Increase in ranking ██ Decrease in ranking — = Not ranked RV = Received votes
	Week																			
Poll	Pre	1	2	3	4	5	6	7	8	9	10	11	12	13	14	15	16	17	18	Final
AP	—	—	—	—	—	—	—													Not released
Coaches	RV	RV	RV	—	—	—														

== See also ==
- 2022–23 Texas A&M Aggies men's basketball team
