= 2022–23 South Carolina Gamecocks women's basketball team =

Intercollegiate basketball season

2022–23 South Carolina Gamecocks women's basketball

SEC Regular Season Champions SEC Tournament Champions

NCAA tournament, Final Four
- Conference: Southeastern Conference

Ranking
- Coaches: No. 3
- AP: No. 1
- Record: 36–1 (16–0 SEC)
- Head coach: Dawn Staley (15th season)
- Assistant coaches: Lisa Boyer; Fred Chmiel; Jolette Law
- Home arena: Colonial Life Arena

2022–23 SEC women's basketball standings
	Conf.				Overall
Team	W		L	PCT	W		L	PCT
No. 1 South Carolina†	16	–	0	1.000	36	–	1	.973
No. 9 LSU	15	–	1	.938	34	–	2	.944
No. 24 Tennessee	13	–	3	.813	25	–	12	.676
Ole Miss	11	–	5	.688	25	–	9	.735
Mississippi State	9	–	7	.563	22	–	11	.667
Georgia	9	–	7	.563	22	–	12	.647
Alabama	9	–	7	.563	20	–	11	.645
Arkansas	7	–	9	.438	24	–	13	.649
Missouri	6	–	10	.375	18	–	14	.563
Florida	5	–	11	.313	19	–	14	.576
Auburn	5	–	11	.313	16	–	15	.516
Vanderbilt	3	–	13	.188	12	–	19	.387
Kentucky	2	–	14	.125	12	–	19	.387
Texas A&M	2	–	14	.125	9	–	20	.310
† 2023 SEC tournament winner As of April 2, 2023; Rankings from AP poll

The 2022–23 South Carolina Gamecocks women's basketball team represented the University of South Carolina during the 2022–23 NCAA Division I women's basketball season. The Gamecocks, led by 15th-year head coach Dawn Staley, played their home games at Colonial Life Arena and competed as members of the Southeastern Conference (SEC), winning both the regular season and conference tournament championships. The Gameocks were the pre-season number 1 ranked team, returning the previous year national championship roster, led by senior forward Aliyah Boston. They retained the number 1 ranking for the entire season. They went undefeated in the regular season. Winning the SEC tournament, they received the automatic bid to the 2023 NCAA Division I women's basketball tournament. They advanced to the Final Four where they lost to the eventual runner-up, Iowa.

== Previous season ==
The Gamecocks finished the season with a 35–2 overall record and a 15–1 record in conference play. The Gamecocks lost the SEC Tournament. They therefore received an at-large bid to the 2022 NCAA Division I Women's Basketball Tournament, where they reached the national championship, defeating UConn 64–49.

== Offseason ==
=== 2022 recruiting class ===
The Gamecocks signed the #6 class for 2022 according to ESPN.

Chloe Kitts reclassified to the class of 2022.

College recruiting
Name	Hometown	School	Height	Weight	Commit date
Ashlyn Watkins #4 P	Columbia, SC	Cardinal Newman	6 ft 3 in (1.91 m)	N/A	Nov 17, 2021
Ashlyn Watkins #4 P	Recruit ratings: ESPN: (97)				
Talyasia Cooper #4 PG	Turbeville, SC	East Clarendon	6 ft 0 in (1.83 m)	N/A	Oct 23, 2021
Talyasia Cooper #4 PG	Recruit ratings: ESPN: (96)				
Chloe Kitts #3 F	Oviedo, FL	DME Academy	6 ft 2 in (1.88 m)	N/A	Nov 4, 2022
Chloe Kitts #3 F	Recruit ratings: ESPN: (96)				
Overall recruit ranking: ESPN: 6
Note: In many cases, Scout, Rivals, 247Sports, On3, and ESPN may conflict in their listings of height and weight.; In these cases, the average was taken. ESPN grades are on a 100-point scale.; Sources: "2022 South Carolina Gamecocks Player Commits". ESPN. Archived from the original on April 8, 2022.

=== Incoming transfers ===
Name	Number	Pos.	Height	Year	Hometown	Previous School
Kierra Fletcher	41	G	5'9"	5th Year	Warren, MI	Transferred from Georgia Tech.

== Preseason ==
Hall of Fame coach Dawn Staley enters her fifteenth year at South Carolina, fresh off winning her 2nd national championship in the 2022 Women's Final Four winning all six games as head coach of South Carolina.

=== Award watch lists ===
Award	Player	Position	Year

=== SEC coaches poll ===
The SEC coaches poll was released on October 18, 2022.

Coaches poll
Predicted finish	Team
1	South Carolina
2	Tennessee
3	LSU
4	Ole Miss
5	Arkansas
6	Georgia
7	Alabama
8	Florida
9	Mississippi State
10	Kentucky
11	Texas A&M
12	Missouri
13	Auburn
14	Vanderbilt

=== SEC Media Poll ===
SEC media poll
Predicted finish	Team
1	South Carolina
2	Tennessee
3	LSU
4	Arkansas
5	Ole Miss
6	Florida
7	Kentucky
8	Mississippi State
9	Georgia
10	Alabama
11	Texas A&M
12	Missouri
13	Auburn
14	Vanderbilt

=== Preseason All-SEC teams ===
The preseason all-SEC women's basketball team was announced on November 3, 2022.

First team

Aliyah Boston – F

Second team

Zia Cooke – G

Victaria Saxton – F

Player of the Year

Aliyah Boston – F

Preseason Defensive Player of the Year

Aliyah Boston – F

== Roster ==
2022–23 South Carolina Gamecocks women's basketball team
Players
Coaches

Pos.	#	Name	Height	Year	Previous school	Hometown
G	0	Olivia Thompson	5 ft 8 in (1.73 m)	Sr	Lexington	Lexington, SC
G	1	Zia Cooke	5 ft 9 in (1.75 m)	Sr	Rogers	Toledo, OH
F	3	Ashlyn Watkins	6 ft 3 in (1.91 m)	Fr	Cardinal Newman	Columbia, SC
F	4	Aliyah Boston	6 ft 5 in (1.96 m)	Sr	Worcester Academy	Saint Thomas, VI
F	5	Victaria Saxton	6 ft 2 in (1.88 m)	Sr	Model	Rome, GA
C	10	Kamilla Cardoso	6 ft 7 in (2.01 m)	Jr	Hamilton Heights; Syracuse	Montes Claros, BR
G	11	Talaysia Cooper	6 ft 0 in (1.83 m)	Fr	East Clarendon	Turbeville, SC
G	12	Brea Beal	6 ft 1 in (1.85 m)	Sr	Rock Island	Rock Island, IL
F	15	Laeticia Amihere	6 ft 4 in (1.93 m)	RS Sr	Kings Way Christian	Milton, ON
G	20	Sania Feagin	6 ft 3 in (1.91 m)	So	Forest Park	Ellenwood, GA
G	21	Chloe Kitts	6 ft 2 in (1.88 m)	Fr	DME Academy	Oviedo, FL
G	23	Bree Hall	6 ft 0 in (1.83 m)	So	Wayne	Dayton, OH
G	25	Raven Johnson	5 ft 8 in (1.73 m)	So	Westlake	Atlanta, GA
G	41	Kierra Fletcher	5 ft 9 in (1.75 m)	Sr	Cousino; Georgia Tech	Warren, MI

Head coach

- Dawn Staley (Virginia)

Assistant coach(es)

- Lisa Boyer (Ithaca)
- Fred Chmiel (Alaska–Anchorage)
- Jolette Law (Iowa)

Legend

- (C) Team captain
- (S) Suspended
- (I) Ineligible
- (W) Walk-on
- Injured
- Current redshirt

Roster
Last update: November 18, 2021

== Starting lineup ==
South Carolina	Position
Aliyah Boston	F
Victaria Saxton	F
Brea Beal	G
Zia Cooke	G
Kierra Fletcher	G

== Schedule ==
Date time, TV	Rank^{#}	Opponent^{#}	Result	Record	High points	High rebounds	High assists	Site (attendance) city, state
Exhibition
October 31, 2022*; 7:00 p.m.	No. 1	Benedict	W 123–32		19 – Tied	12 – Feagin	6 – Tied	Colonial Life Arena; Columbia, SC
Regular season
November 7, 2022*; 8:30 p.m., SECN	No. 1	East Tennessee State	W 101–31	1–0	17 – Cooke	11 – Boston	4 – Johnson	Colonial Life Arena (12,779); Columbia, SC
November 11, 2022*; 6:00 p.m., ESPN2	No. 1	at No. 17 Maryland	W 81–56	2–0	18 – Cooke	13 – Boston	4 – Beal	Xfinity Center (9,244); College Park, MD
November 17, 2022*; 6:00 p.m., ACCN	No. 1	at Clemson	W 85–31	3–0	15 – Cooke	7 – Beal	5 – Johnson	Littlejohn Coliseum (3,051); Clemson, SC
November 20, 2022*; 3:00 p.m., ABC	No. 1	at No. 2 Stanford	W 76–71 ^{OT}	4–0	14 – Boston	13 – Boston	4 – Cooke	Maples Pavilion (7,287); Stanford, CA
November 22, 2022*; 8:00 p.m., ESPN+	No. 1	at Cal Poly	W 79–36	5–0	13 – Amihere	11 – Watkins	5 – Tied	Mott Athletics Center (2,384); San Luis Obispo, CA
November 27, 2022*; 12:00 p.m., SECN+	No. 1	Hampton	W 85–38	6–0	14 – Tied	14 – Cardoso	5 – Johnson	Colonial Life Arena (11,659); Columbia, SC
November 29, 2022*; 7:00 p.m., SECN	No. 1	No. 15 UCLA	W 74–64	7–0	18 – Boston	10 – Tied	3 – Tied	Colonial Life Arena (12,501); Columbia, SC
December 3, 2022*; 3:00 p.m., SECN+	No. 1	Memphis	W 79–54	8–0	18 – Cardoso	10 – Tied	5 – Johnson	Colonial Life Arena (11,943); Columbia, SC
December 11, 2022*; 2:00 p.m., SECN+	No. 1	Liberty	W 88–39	9–0	20 – Cooke	9 – Cardoso	5 – Johnson	Colonial Life Arena (11,787); Columbia, SC
December 15, 2022*; 7:00 p.m., ESPN2	No. 1	vs. South Dakota State	W 62–44	10–0	18 – Cooke	15 – Cardoso	3 – Tied	Sanford Pentagon (2,369); Sioux Falls, SD
December 18, 2022*; 2:00 p.m., SECN+	No. 1	Charleston Southern	W 87–23	11–0	16 – Cooke	13 – Boston	3 – Tied	Colonial Life Arena (11,267); Columbia, SC
December 21, 2022*; 12:00 p.m., SECN+	No. 1	Coastal Carolina	W 102–39	12–0	16 – Watkins	10 – Boston	6 – Johnson	Colonial Life Arena (11,649); Columbia, SC
December 29, 2022; 7:00 p.m., SECN	No. 1	Texas A&M	W 76–34	13–0 (1–0)	15 – Cooper	6 – Tied	2 – Tied	Colonial Life Arena (13,003); Columbia, SC
January 2, 2023; 7:00 p.m., SECN	No. 1	at Georgia	W 68–51	14–0 (2–0)	31 – Cooke	7 – Cardoso	5 – Beal	Stegeman Coliseum (10,523); Athens, GA
January 5, 2023; 7:00 p.m., SECN+	No. 1	Auburn	W 94–42	15–0 (3–0)	16 – Cardoso	9 – Boston	7 – Johnson	Colonial Life Arena (11,552); Columbia, SC
January 8, 2023; 1:00 p.m., ESPN2	No. 1	at Mississippi State	W 58–51	16–0 (4–0)	16 – Cooke	15 – Boston	4 – Beal	Humphrey Coliseum (5,776); Starkville, MS
January 12, 2023; 7:00 p.m., SECN+	No. 1	at Kentucky	W 95–66	17–0 (5–0)	21 – Boston	11 – Boston	7 – Johnson	Memorial Coliseum (4,016); Lexington, KY
January 15, 2023; 1:00 p.m., ESPN	No. 1	Missouri	W 81–50	18–0 (6–0)	20 – Boston	10 – Boston	6 – Beal	Colonial Life Arena (15,444); Columbia, SC
January 19, 2023; 7:00 p.m., SECN	No. 1	at Vanderbilt	W 96–48	19–0 (7–0)	17 – Cooke	15 – Cardoso	4 – Johnson	Memorial Gymnasium (3,028); Nashville, TN
January 22, 2023; 3:00 p.m., ESPN2	No. 1	Arkansas	W 92–46	20–0 (8–0)	24 – Cooke	16 – Cardoso	3 – Tied	Colonial Life Arena (13,349); Columbia, SC
January 29, 2023; 1:00 p.m., ESPN2	No. 1	at Alabama	W 65–52	21–0 (9–0)	18 – Hall	12 – Boston	4 – Tied	Coleman Coliseum (4,255); Tuscaloosa, AL
February 2, 2023; 7:00 p.m., SECN	No. 1	Kentucky	W 87–69	22–0 (10–0)	14 – Tied	14 – Boston	4 – Johnson	Colonial Life Arena (12,743); Columbia, SC
February 5, 2023*; 12:00 p.m., FOX	No. 1	at No. 5 UConn	W 81–77	23–0	26 – Boston	12 – Boston	7 – Johnson	XL Center (15,564); Hartford, CT
February 9, 2023; 8:00 p.m., SECN+	No. 1	at Auburn	W 83–48	24–0 (11–0)	15 – Cooke	8 – Boston	4 – Tied	Neville Arena (2,860); Auburn, AL
February 12, 2023; 2:00 p.m., ESPN	No. 1	No. 3 LSU	W 88–64	25–0 (12–0)	18 – Cardoso	13 – Cardoso	4 – Beal	Colonial Life Arena (18,000); Columbia, SC
February 16, 2023; 7:00 p.m., SECN+	No. 1	Florida	W 87–56	26–0 (13–0)	22 – Cooke	11 – Cardoso	3 – Tied	Colonial Life Arena (13,943); Columbia, SC
February 19, 2023; 4:00 p.m., SECN	No. 1	at Ole Miss	W 64–57 ^{OT}	27–0 (14–0)	24 – Cooke	12 – Boston	5 – Beal	SJB Pavilion (6,563); Oxford, MS
February 23, 2023; 7:00 p.m., ESPN	No. 1	at Tennessee	W 73–60	28–0 (15–0)	19 – Cooke	15 – Cardoso	5 – Beal	Thompson–Boling Arena (10,297); Knoxville, TN
February 26, 2023; 12:00 p.m., ESPN2	No. 1	Georgia	W 73–63	29–0 (16–0)	25 – Boston	11 – Boston	4 – Johnson	Colonial Life Arena (18,000); Columbia, SC
SEC Tournament
March 3, 2023; 12:00 p.m., SECN	(1) No. 1	vs. (8) Arkansas; Quarterfinals	W 93–66	30–0	19 – Saxton	10 – Boston	6 – Johnson	Bon Secours Wellness Arena (7,481); Greenville, SC
March 4, 2023; 4:30 p.m., ESPNU	(1) No. 1	vs. (4) Ole Miss; Semifinals	W 80–51	31–0	17 – Amihere	12 – Cardoso	7 – Amihere	Bon Secours Wellness Arena (10,471); Greenville, SC
March 5, 2023; 2:00 p.m., ESPN	(1) No. 1	vs. (3) Tennessee; SEC Championship/College Gameday	W 74–58	32–0	24 – Cooke	8 – Beal	6 – Beal	Bon Secours Wellness Arena (12,203); Greenville, SC
NCAA Tournament
March 17, 2023; 2:00 p.m., ESPN	(1 G1) No. 1	(16 G1) Norfolk State; First Round	W 72–40	33–0	11 – Tied	9 – Boston	7 – Johnson	Colonial Life Arena (10,056); Columbia, SC
March 19, 2023; 1:00 p.m., ABC	(1 G1) No. 1	(8 G1) South Florida; Second Round	W 76–45	34–0	21 – Cooke	11 – Boston	3 – Tied	Colonial Life Arena (10,335); Columbia, SC
March 25, 2023*; 2:00 p.m., ESPN	(1 G1) No. 1	vs. (4 G1) No. 14 UCLA; Sweet Sixteen	W 59–43	35–0	10 – Tied	14 – Boston	5 – Fletcher	Bon Secours Wellness Arena (12,879); Greenville, SC
March 27, 2023*; 7:00 p.m., ESPN	(1 G1) No. 1	vs. (2 G1) No. 7 Maryland; Elite Eight	W 86–75	36–0	22 – Boston	10 – Boston	6 – Beal	Bon Secours Wellness Arena (11,144); Greenville, SC
March 31, 2023*; 9:30 p.m., ESPN	(1 G1) No. 1	vs. (2 S4) No. 3 Iowa; Final Four	L 73–77	36–1	24 – Cooke	14 – Cardoso	3 – Boston	American Airlines Center (19,288); Dallas, TX
*Non-conference game. ^{#}Rankings from AP Poll. (#) Tournament seedings in parentheses. G1=Greenville 1 S4=Seattle 4. All times are in Eastern Time.

== Statistics ==
=== Team total per game ===
Team	PTS	FGM	FGA	FG%	3PM	3PA	3P%	FTM	FTA	FT%	REB	AST	STL	BLK	ATT
Gamecocks	2606	983	2090	47%	141	448	32%	499	716	70%	1587	537	215	288	199,619
Opponents	1635	599	1907	31%	127	498	26%	310	442	70%	930	257	181	125	113,074

=== Team average per game ===
Team	PPG	FG	FG%	3P	3P%	FT	FT%	REB	AST	STL	BLK	ATT
Gamecocks	–	–	–	–	–	–	–	–	–	–	–	–
Opponents	–	–	–	–	–	–	–	–	–	–	–	–

=== Individual total per game ===
Player	GP	MP	PTS	FGM	FGA	FG%	3M	3A	3P%	FTM	FTA	FT%	ORB	DRB	REB	AST	TO	STL	BLK
Aliyah Boston																			
Zia Cooke																			
Laeticia Amihere																			
Victaria Saxton																			
Kamilla Cardoso																			
Brea Beal																			
Bree Hall																			
Sania Feagin																			
Olivia Thompson																			
Raven Johnson																			
Ashlyn Watkins																			
Talaysia Cooper																			
Kierra Fletcher																			
Chloe Kitts																			

=== Individual average per game ===
Player	GP	MIN	FG%	3P%	FT%	OREB	DREB	REB	AST	STL	BLK	PPG
Aliyah Boston	31	25	57%	12%	77%	3.4	6.8	9.7	1.8	0.5	2.0	13.3
Zia Cooke	32											
Laeticia Amihere												
Victoria Saxton												
Kamilla Cardoso												
Brea Beal												
Bree Hall												
Sania Feagin												
Olivia Thompson												
Raven Johnson												
Ashlyn Watkins												
Talaysia Cooper												
Kierra Fletcher												
Chloe Kitts												

== Rankings ==
Regular season polls
Poll	Pre- Season	Week 2	Week 3	Week 4	Week 5	Week 6	Week 7	Week 8	Week 9	Week 10	Week 11	Week 12	Week 13	Week 14	Week 15	Week 16	Week 17	Week 18	Week 19	Final
AP	1 (30)	1 (30)	1 (29)	1 (29)	1 (29)	1 (28)	1 (28)	1 (28)	1 (28)	1 (28)	1 (28)	1 (28)	1 (28)	1 (28)	1 (28)	1 (27)	1 (28)	1 (28)	1 (28)	
Coaches	1 (30)	1 (32)	1 (32)	1 (32)	1 (32)	1 (32)	1 (32)	1 (32)	1 (32)	1 (32)	1 (32)	1 (32)	1 (32)	1 (32)	1 (32)	1 (31)	1 (32)	1 (30)	1 (32)	3

Legend
	Increase in ranking
	Decrease in ranking
	Not ranked previous week
RV	Received votes
NR	Not ranked
( )	Number of first place votes

== See also ==
- 2022–23 South Carolina Gamecocks men's basketball team
