= 2022–23 Florida Gators women's basketball team =

American college basketball season

2022–23 Florida Gators women's basketball

WNIT, Great 8
- Conference: Southeastern Conference
- Record: 19–15 (5–11 SEC)
- Head coach: Kelly Rae Finley (2nd season)
- Assistant coaches: Julian Assibey; Tamisha Augustin; Cynthia Jordan
- Home arena: O'Connell Center

2022–23 SEC women's basketball standings
	Conf.				Overall
Team	W		L	PCT	W		L	PCT
No. 1 South Carolina†	16	–	0	1.000	36	–	1	.973
No. 9 LSU	15	–	1	.938	34	–	2	.944
No. 24 Tennessee	13	–	3	.813	25	–	12	.676
Ole Miss	11	–	5	.688	25	–	9	.735
Mississippi State	9	–	7	.563	22	–	11	.667
Georgia	9	–	7	.563	22	–	12	.647
Alabama	9	–	7	.563	20	–	11	.645
Arkansas	7	–	9	.438	24	–	13	.649
Missouri	6	–	10	.375	18	–	14	.563
Florida	5	–	11	.313	19	–	14	.576
Auburn	5	–	11	.313	16	–	15	.516
Vanderbilt	3	–	13	.188	12	–	19	.387
Kentucky	2	–	14	.125	12	–	19	.387
Texas A&M	2	–	14	.125	9	–	20	.310
† 2023 SEC tournament winner As of April 2, 2023; Rankings from AP poll

The 2022–23 Florida Gators women's basketball team represented University of Florida in the 2022–23 college basketball season. Led by second year head coach Kelly Rae Finley, the team played their games at O'Connell Center as members of the Southeastern Conference.

The Gators finished the season with a 19–15 overall record, 5–11 in the SEC conference. In the postseason, they were defeated by Kentucky in the first round of the SEC Tournament, but qualified to enter the Women's National Invitation Tournament, where they advanced to the quarterfinals before losing to Bowling Green.

== Schedule and results ==
Date time, TV	Rank^{#}	Opponent^{#}	Result	Record	Site (attendance) city, state
Exhibition
November 2, 2022*; 7:00 p.m.		Saint Leo	W 110–46		O'Connell Center; Gainesville, FL
Non-conference regular season
November 7, 2022*; 5:30 p.m., SECN+		Florida A&M	W 83–55	1–0	O'Connell Center (1,232); Gainesville, FL
November 13, 2022*; 2:00 p.m., SECN		UNC Asheville	W 86–40	2–0	O'Connell Center (1,112); Gainesville, FL
November 16, 2022*; 6:00 p.m., ACCNX		at Florida State	L 77–92	2–1	Donald L. Tucker Civic Center (2,505); Tallahassee, FL
November 18, 2022*; 6:00 p.m., SECN+		Bethune–Cookman	W 82–73	3–1	O'Connell Center (735); Gainesville, FL
November 21, 2022*; 6:00 p.m., SECN+		Furman	W 77–50	4–1	O'Connell Center; Gainesville, FL
November 24, 2022*; 3:00 p.m., FloSports		vs. Green Bay; St. Pete Showcase	W 61–52	5–1	McArthur Gymnasium (182); St. Petersburg, FL
November 26, 2022*; 12:00 p.m., FloSports		vs. Houston; St. Pete Showcase	W 77–73 ^{OT}	6–1	McArthur Gymnasium (158); St. Petersburg, FL
November 30, 2022*; 5:30 p.m., SECN+		Prairie View A&M	W 68–53	7–1	O'Connell Center (915); Gainesville, FL
December 4, 2022*; 1:00 p.m., ESPN+		at Dayton	W 69–65	8–1	UD Arena (2,052); Dayton, OH
December 6, 2022*; 6:00 p.m., SECN+		Presbyterian	W 78–52	9–1	O'Connell Center (615); Gainesville, FL
December 11, 2022*; 4:00 p.m., ACCN		at Miami (FL)	W 76–73 ^{OT}	10–1	Watsco Center (3,251); Coral Gables, FL
December 18, 2022*; 2:00 p.m., SECN+		UNC Greensboro	W 79–55	11–1	O'Connell Center (1,010); Gainesville, FL
December 21, 2022*; 9:30 p.m., ESPN2		vs. No. 23 Oklahoma; Jumpman Invitational	L 79–95	11–2	Spectrum Center (19,236); Charlotte, NC
SEC regular season
December 29, 2022; 6:00 p.m., SECN+		Tennessee	L 67–77	11–3 (0–1)	O'Connell Center (2,656); Gainesville, FL
January 1, 2023; 2:00 p.m., SECN		at Texas A&M	W 55–48	12–3 (1–1)	Reed Arena (3,255); College Station, TX
January 5, 2023; 8:00 p.m., SECN+		at Arkansas	L 74–102	12–4 (1–2)	Bud Walton Arena (4,524); Fayetteville, AR
January 8, 2023; 12:00 p.m., ESPNU		Georgia	L 77–82	12–5 (1–3)	O'Connell Center (1,821); Gainesville, FL
January 15, 2023; 3:00 p.m., SECN		Kentucky	L 75–81	12–6 (1–4)	O'Connell Center (1,625); Gainesville, FL
January 19, 2023; 6:30 p.m., SECN+		at Tennessee	L 56–74	12–7 (1–5)	Thompson–Boling Arena (7,552); Knoxville, TN
January 22, 2023; 2:00 p.m., SECN+		Vanderbilt	W 73–55	13–7 (2–5)	O'Connell Center (1,325); Gainesville, FL
January 30, 2023; 7:00 p.m., SECN		at Auburn	L 55–66	13–8 (2–6)	Neville Arena (2,551); Auburn, AL
February 2, 2023; 6:00 p.m., SECN+		Texas A&M	W 61–54	14–8 (3–6)	O'Connell Center (2,099); Gainesville, FL
February 5, 2023; 4:00 p.m., ESPNU		at Ole Miss	L 42–68	14–9 (3–7)	SJB Pavilion (3,216); Oxford, MS
February 9, 2023; 7:00 p.m., SECN		Mississippi State	L 56–73	14–10 (3–8)	O'Connell Center (1,170); Gainesville, FL
February 12, 2023; 1:00 p.m., SECN		at Georgia	L 55–81	14–11 (3–9)	Stegeman Coliseum (3,834); Athens, GA
February 16, 2023; 7:00 p.m., SECN+		at No. 1 South Carolina	L 56–87	14–12 (3–10)	Colonial Life Arena (13,943); Columbia, SC
February 19, 2023; 2:00 p.m., SECN		No. 5 LSU	L 79–90	14–13 (3–11)	O'Connell Center (3,498); Gainesville, FL
February 23, 2023; 6:00 p.m., SECN+		Alabama	W 81–77	15–13 (4–11)	O'Connell Center (1,433); Gainesville, FL
February 26, 2023; 3:00 p.m., SECN+		at Missouri	W 61–52	16–13 (5–11)	Mizzou Arena (4,556); Columbia, MO
SEC Tournament
March 1, 2023; 1:30 p.m., SECN	(11)	vs. (14) Kentucky; First Round	L 57–72	16–14	Bon Secours Wellness Arena (8,125); Greenville, SC
WNIT Tournament
March 16, 2023; 6:00 p.m., SECN+		Wofford; First Round	W 66–63	17–14	O'Connell Center (512); Gainesville, FL
March 20, 2023; 6:00 p.m., ACCNX		at Wake Forest; Second Round	W 80–63	18–14	LJVM Coliseum (701); Winston-Salem, NC
March 23, 2023*; 7:00 p.m., ACCNX		at Clemson; Super 16	W 73–63	19–14	Littlejohn Coliseum (1,103); Clemson, SC
March 27, 2023*; 6:00 p.m., ACCNX		at Bowling Green; Great 8	L 52–69	19–15	Stroh Center; Bowling Green, OH
*Non-conference game. ^{#}Rankings from AP Poll. (#) Tournament seedings in parentheses. All times are in Eastern.

== Rankings ==
Ranking movements Legend: ██ Increase in ranking ██ Decrease in ranking — = Not ranked RV = Received votes
	Week																				
Poll	Pre	1	2	3	4	5	6	7	8	9	10	11	12	13	14	15	16	17	18	19	Final
AP	RV	RV	RV	—	—	—	—														Not released
Coaches	—	—	—	—	—	—															

== See also ==
- 2022–23 Florida Gators men's basketball team
