= 2022–23 Kentucky Wildcats women's basketball team =

American college basketball season

2022–23 Kentucky Wildcats women's basketball
- Conference: Southeastern Conference
- Record: 12–19 (2–14 SEC)
- Head coach: Kyra Elzy (3rd season)
- Associate head coach: Niya Butts
- Assistant coaches: Amber Smith; Jen Hoover
- Home arena: Memorial Coliseum

2022–23 SEC women's basketball standings
	Conf.				Overall
Team	W		L	PCT	W		L	PCT
No. 1 South Carolina†	16	–	0	1.000	36	–	1	.973
No. 9 LSU	15	–	1	.938	34	–	2	.944
No. 24 Tennessee	13	–	3	.813	25	–	12	.676
Ole Miss	11	–	5	.688	25	–	9	.735
Mississippi State	9	–	7	.563	22	–	11	.667
Georgia	9	–	7	.563	22	–	12	.647
Alabama	9	–	7	.563	20	–	11	.645
Arkansas	7	–	9	.438	24	–	13	.649
Missouri	6	–	10	.375	18	–	14	.563
Florida	5	–	11	.313	19	–	14	.576
Auburn	5	–	11	.313	16	–	15	.516
Vanderbilt	3	–	13	.188	12	–	19	.387
Kentucky	2	–	14	.125	12	–	19	.387
Texas A&M	2	–	14	.125	9	–	20	.310
† 2023 SEC tournament winner As of April 2, 2023; Rankings from AP poll

The 2022–23 Kentucky Wildcats women's basketball team represented the University of Kentucky (UK) in the 2022–23 college basketball season. Led by third-year head coach Kyra Elzy, the Wildcats played home games at Memorial Coliseum as members of the Southeastern Conference.

== Roster ==
2022–23 Kentucky Wildcats women's basketball team
Players
Coaches

Pos.	#	Name	Height	Year	Previous school	Hometown
C	0	Tionna Herron	6 ft 4 in (1.93 m)	Fr	DeSoto HS	DeSoto, TX
G	1	Robyn Benton	5 ft 9 in (1.75 m)	GS	Greater Atlanta Christian School; Auburn	Conyers, GA
G	2	Saniah Tyler	5 ft 6 in (1.68 m)	Fr	Incarnate Word Academy	Florissant, MO
G	3	Kennedy Cambridge	5 ft 8 in (1.73 m)	Fr	The Ensworth School	Nashville, TN
G	4	Eniya Russell	6 ft 1 in (1.85 m)	Jr	St. Vincent Pallotti HS; South Carolina	Baltimore, MD
G	5	Blair Green	6 ft 2 in (1.88 m)	GS	Harlan County HS	Harlan County, KY
G	11	Jada Walker	5 ft 7 in (1.7 m)	So	Henrico HS	Richmond, VA
F	13	Ajae Petty	6 ft 3 in (1.91 m)	Jr	Baltimore Poly; LSU	Baltimore, MD
G	20	Amiya Jenkins	5 ft 10 in (1.78 m)	Fr	Anderson County HS	Lexington, KY
F	21	Nyah Leveretter	6 ft 3 in (1.91 m)	Jr	Westwood HS	Blythewood, SC
G	22	Maddie Scherr	5 ft 11 in (1.8 m)	Jr	Ryle HS; Oregon	Florence, KY
G	23	Cassidy Rowe	5 ft 6 in (1.68 m)	Fr	Shelby Valley HS	Virgie, KY
F	24	Zennia Thomas	6 ft 2 in (1.88 m)	Fr	Warrensville Heights HS	Lyndhurst, OH
F	25	Adebola Adeyeye	6 ft 2 in (1.88 m)	GS	The Rock School; Buffalo	Brampton, ON
G	34	Emma King	5 ft 10 in (1.78 m)	Sr	Lincoln County HS	Stanford, KY

Head coach

- Kyra Elzy (Tennessee)

Assistant coach(es)

- Niya Butts (Tennessee)
- Amber Smith (Kentucky)
- Jen Hoover (Wake Forest)

Legend

- (C) Team captain
- (S) Suspended
- (I) Ineligible
- (W) Walk-on
- Injured
- Current redshirt

Roster

== Schedule and results ==
Date time, TV	Rank^{#}	Opponent^{#}	Result	Record	Site (attendance) city, state
Exhibition
November 2, 2022*; 7:00 p.m.		Pikeville	W 93−45		Memorial Coliseum (888); Lexington, KY
Non-conference regular season
November 7, 2022*; 7:00 p.m., SECN+		Radford	W 82–78	1–0	Memorial Coliseum (2,911); Lexington, KY
November 11, 2022*; 6:00 p.m., SECN+		Morehead State	W 73–48	2–0	Memorial Coliseum (3,015); Lexington, KY
November 13, 2022*; 1:00 p.m., SECN+		Coastal Carolina	W 79–53	3–0	Memorial Coliseum (3,012); Lexington, KY
November 17, 2022*; 7:00 p.m., SECN+		Bellarmine	W 63–45	4–0	Memorial Coliseum (2,935); Lexington, KY
November 21, 2022*; 12:00 p.m.		vs. No. 11 Virginia Tech; Baha Mar Hoops Pink Flamingo Championship	L 74–82	4–1	Baha Mar Convention Center; Nassau, Bahamas
November 23, 2022*; 4:30 p.m.		vs. Dayton; Baha Mar Hoops Pink Flamingo Championship	W 70–44	5–1	Baha Mar Convention Center; Nassau, Bahamas
December 4, 2022*; 1:00 p.m., SECN+		UNC Greensboro	W 82–56	6–1	Memorial Coliseum; Lexington, KY
December 7, 2022*; 8:00 p.m.		at Minnesota	W 80–74	7–1	Williams Arena (2,495); Minneapolis, MN
December 11, 2022*; 1:00 p.m., ESPN		Louisville; Rivalry	L 72–86	7–2	Rupp Arena (7,927); Lexington, KY
December 16, 2022*; 7:00 p.m., SECN		Murray State	L 44–51	7–3	Memorial Coliseum (3,178); Lexington, KY
December 18, 2022*; 1:00 p.m., SECN+		Florida Gulf Coast	L 63–69	7–4	Memorial Coliseum (3,267); Lexington, KY
December 21, 2022*; 11:00 a.m., SECN+		Ohio	W 95–86	8–4	Memorial Coliseum (3,126); Lexington, KY
SEC regular season
December 29, 2022; 9:00 p.m., SECN		at Missouri	L 71–74	8–5 (0–1)	Mizzou Arena (3,258); Columbia, MO
January 1, 2023; 2:00 p.m., SECN+		No. 24 Arkansas	L 50–71	8–6 (0–2)	Memorial Coliseum (3,284); Lexington, KY
January 5, 2023; 7:00 p.m., SECN		at Georgia	L 60–64	8–7 (0–3)	Stegeman Coliseum (1,931); Athens, GA
January 8, 2023; 2:00 p.m., SECN		No. 7 LSU	L 48–67	8–8 (0–4)	Rupp Arena (3,410); Lexington, KY
January 12, 2023; 7:00 p.m., SECN+		No. 1 South Carolina	L 66–95	8–9 (0–5)	Memorial Coliseum (4,016); Lexington, KY
January 15, 2023; 3:00 p.m., SECN		at Florida	W 81–75	9–9 (1–5)	O'Connell Center (1,625); Gainesville, FL
January 22, 2023; 1:00 p.m., SECN		at Mississippi State	L 76–77	9–10 (1–6)	Humphrey Coliseum (5,130); Mississippi State, MS
January 26, 2023; 7:00 p.m., SEC+		Auburn	L 68–71	9–11 (1–7)	Memorial Coliseum (3,123); Lexington, KY
January 29, 2023; 3:00 p.m., SECN		Missouri	W 77–54	10–11 (2–7)	Memorial Coliseum (3,914); Lexington, KY
February 2, 2023; 7:00 p.m., SECN		at No. 1 South Carolina	L 69–87	10–12 (2–8)	Colonial Life Arena (12,743); Columbia, SC
February 9, 2023; 7:00 p.m., SECN+		Alabama	L 65–72	10–13 (2–9)	Memorial Coliseum (3,277); Lexington, KY
February 13, 2023; 7:00 p.m., SECN		at Ole Miss	L 52–74	10–14 (2–10)	SJB Pavilion (2,391); Oxford, MS
February 16, 2023; 7:00 p.m., SECN+		Georgia	L 40–50	10–15 (2–11)	Memorial Coliseum; Lexington, KY
February 19, 2023; 3:00 p.m., SECN+		at Vanderbilt	L 57–79	10–16 (2–12)	Memorial Gym (2,468); Nashville, TN
February 23, 2023; 7:00 p.m., SECN		at Texas A&M	L 67–74	10–17 (2–13)	Reed Arena (2,795); College Station, TX
February 26, 2023; 2:00 p.m., SECN		Tennessee; Rivalry	L 63–83	10–18 (2–14)	Memorial Coliseum (6,152); Lexington, KY
SEC Tournament
March 1, 2023; 1:30 p.m., SECN	(14)	vs. (11) Florida; First Round	W 72–57	11–18	Bon Secours Wellness Arena (8,125); Greenville, SC
March 2, 2023; 8:00 p.m., SECN	(14)	vs. (6) Alabama; Second Round	W 71–58	12–18	Bon Secours Wellness Arena (7,691); Greenville, SC
March 3, 2023; 8:00 p.m., SECN	(14)	vs. (3) Tennessee; Quarterfinals / Rivalry	L 71–80	12–19	Bon Secours Wellness Arena; Greenville, SC
*Non-conference game. ^{#}Rankings from AP Poll. (#) Tournament seedings in parentheses. All times are in Eastern.

== Rankings ==
Ranking movements Legend: ██ Increase in ranking ██ Decrease in ranking — = Not ranked RV = Received votes
	Week																			
Poll	Pre	1	2	3	4	5	6	7	8	9	10	11	12	13	14	15	16	17	18	Final
AP	—	—	—	—	—	—	—													Not released
Coaches	RV	RV	—	—	—	—														

== See also ==
- 2022–23 Kentucky Wildcats men's basketball team
