= 2022–23 Georgia Lady Bulldogs basketball team =

American college basketball season

2022–23 Georgia Lady Bulldogs basketball

NCAA tournament, Second Round
- Conference: Southeastern Conference
- Record: 22–12 (9–7 SEC)
- Head coach: Katie Abrahamson-Henderson (1st season)
- Associate head coach: Tahnee Balerio
- Assistant coaches: Isoken Uzamere; Nykesha Sales
- Home arena: Stegeman Coliseum

2022–23 SEC women's basketball standings
	Conf.				Overall
Team	W		L	PCT	W		L	PCT
No. 1 South Carolina†	16	–	0	1.000	36	–	1	.973
No. 9 LSU	15	–	1	.938	34	–	2	.944
No. 24 Tennessee	13	–	3	.813	25	–	12	.676
Ole Miss	11	–	5	.688	25	–	9	.735
Mississippi State	9	–	7	.563	22	–	11	.667
Georgia	9	–	7	.563	22	–	12	.647
Alabama	9	–	7	.563	20	–	11	.645
Arkansas	7	–	9	.438	24	–	13	.649
Missouri	6	–	10	.375	18	–	14	.563
Florida	5	–	11	.313	19	–	14	.576
Auburn	5	–	11	.313	16	–	15	.516
Vanderbilt	3	–	13	.188	12	–	19	.387
Kentucky	2	–	14	.125	12	–	19	.387
Texas A&M	2	–	14	.125	9	–	20	.310
† 2023 SEC tournament winner As of April 2, 2023; Rankings from AP poll

The 2022–23 Georgia Lady Bulldogs basketball team represented the University of Georgia in the 2022–23 college basketball season. Led by first year head coach Katie Abrahamson-Henderson, the team played their games at Stegeman Coliseum and are members of the Southeastern Conference.

== Schedule and results ==
Date time, TV	Rank^{#}	Opponent^{#}	Result	Record	Site (attendance) city, state
Non-conference regular season
November 7, 2022*; 6:00 p.m., SECN+		Coastal Carolina	W 78–61	1–0	Stegeman Coliseum; Athens, GA
November 10, 2022*; 7:00 p.m., SECN+		Alabama State	W 77–47	2–0	Stegeman Coliseum (1,778); Athens, GA
November 13, 2022*; 2:00 p.m., SECN+		Jacksonville State	W 52–44	3–0	Stegeman Coliseum (2,179); Athens, GA
November 16, 2022*; 7:00 p.m., SECN+		Kennesaw State	W 89–47	4–0	Stegeman Coliseum (1,775); Athens, GA
November 20, 2022*; 2:00 p.m., ACCN		at Georgia Tech	W 66–52	5–0	McCamish Pavilion (2,384); Atlanta, GA
November 24, 2022*; 1:00 p.m., ESPN3		vs. Wisconsin; Paradise Jam	W 68–60	6–0	Sports and Fitness Center; Saint Thomas, USVI
November 25, 2022*; 3:15 p.m.		vs. VCU; Paradise Jam	W 68–54	7–0	Sports and Fitness Center (824); Saint Thomas, USVI
November 26, 2022*; 3:15 p.m.		vs. Seton Hall; Paradise Jam	L 80–86	7–1	Sports and Fitness Center (624); Saint Thomas, USVI
December 1, 2022*; 7:00 p.m., SECN+		Furman	W 78–58	8–1	Stegeman Coliseum (1,936); Athens, GA
December 5, 2022*; 8:00 p.m., SECN		No. 8 NC State	L 54–65	8–2	Stegeman Coliseum (2,048); Athens, GA
December 7, 2022*; 11:00 a.m., SECN+		Mercer	W 84–44	9–2	Stegeman Coliseum (5,292); Athens, GA
December 17, 2022*; 2:00 p.m., SECN+		Belmont	W 66–55	10–2	Stegeman Coliseum (3,240); Athens, GA
December 20, 2022*; 2:30 p.m.		vs. West Virginia; West Palm Beach Invitational	L 45–49	10–3	Massimino Court (605); West Palm Beach, FL
December 21, 2022*; 2:30 p.m.		vs. San Diego State; West Palm Beach Invitational	W 63–44	11–3	Massimino Court (434); West Palm Beach, FL
SEC regular season
December 29, 2022; 7:00 p.m., SECN+		at Alabama	L 53–56	11–4 (0–1)	Coleman Coliseum (2,234); Tuscaloosa, AL
January 2, 2023; 7:00 p.m., SECN		No. 1 South Carolina	L 51–68	11–5 (0–2)	Stegeman Coliseum (6,225); Athens, GA
January 5, 2023; 7:00 p.m., SECN		Kentucky	W 64–60	12–5 (1–2)	Stegeman Coliseum (1,931); Athens, GA
January 8, 2023; 12:00 p.m., ESPNU		at Florida	W 82–77	13–5 (2–2)	O'Connell Center (1,821); Gainesville, FL
January 12, 2023; 7:00 p.m., SECN+		Ole Miss	L 58–66	13–6 (2–3)	Stegeman Coliseum (1,922); Athens, GA
January 15, 2023; 1:00 p.m., SECN		at Tennessee	L 55–68	13–7 (2–4)	Thompson–Boling Arena (9,772); Knoxville, TN
January 22, 2023; 3:00 p.m., SECN		at Texas A&M	L 73–75	13–8 (2–5)	Reed Arena (3,591); College Station, TX
January 26, 2023; 7:00 p.m., SECN+		Missouri	W 62–51	14–8 (3–5)	Stegeman Coliseum (2,029); Athens, GA
January 29, 2023; 2:00 p.m., SECN+		Mississippi State	W 62–34	15–8 (4–5)	Stegeman Coliseum (3,852); Athens, GA
February 2, 2023; 8:00 p.m., SECN+		at No. 3 LSU	L 77–82 ^{OT}	15–9 (4–6)	Pete Maravich Assembly Center (8,716); Baton Rouge, LA
February 5, 2023; 1:00 p.m., SECN		Vanderbilt	W 79–61	16–9 (5–6)	Memorial Gymnasium (2,398); Nashville, TN
February 12, 2023; 1:00 p.m., SECN		Florida	W 81–55	17–9 (6–6)	Stegeman Coliseum (3,834); Athens, GA
February 16, 2023; 7:00 p.m., SECN+		at Kentucky	W 50–40	18–9 (7–6)	Memorial Coliseum (3,308); Lexington, KY
February 19, 2023; 12:00 p.m., SECN		Arkansas	W 71–48	19–9 (8–6)	Stegeman Coliseum (4,109); Athens, GA
February 23, 2023; 7:00 p.m., SECN+		Auburn	W 70–59	20–9 (9–6)	Stegeman Coliseum (2,571); Athens, GA
February 26, 2023; 12:00 p.m., ESPN2		at No. 1 South Carolina	L 63–73	20–10 (9–7)	Colonial Life Arena (18,000); Columbia, SC
SEC Tournament
March 2, 2023; 6:00 p.m., SECN	(7)	vs. (10) Auburn; Second Round	W 63–47	21–10	Bon Secours Wellness Arena (7,691); Greenville, SC
March 3, 2023; 6:00 p.m., SECN	(7)	vs. (2) No. 4 LSU; Quarterfinals	L 66–83	21–11	Bon Secours Wellness Arena; Greenville, SC
NCAA tournament
March 17, 2023; 1:30 p.m., ESPNews	(10 S4)	vs. (7 S4) Florida State; First round	W 66–54	22–11	Carver–Hawkeye Arena (14,382); Iowa City, IA
March 19, 2023*; 3:00 p.m., ABC	(10 S4)	at (2 S4) No. 3 Iowa; Second round	L 66–74	22–12	Carver–Hawkeye Arena (14,382); Iowa City, IA
*Non-conference game. ^{#}Rankings from AP Poll. (#) Tournament seedings in parentheses. All times are in Eastern.

== Rankings ==
Ranking movements Legend: ██ Increase in ranking ██ Decrease in ranking — = Not ranked RV = Received votes
	Week																				
Poll	Pre	1	2	3	4	5	6	7	8	9	10	11	12	13	14	15	16	17	18	19	Final
AP	RV	RV	RV	RV	—	—	—														Not released
Coaches	RV	RV	RV	RV	—	—															

== See also ==
- 2022–23 Georgia Bulldogs basketball team
