= 2022–23 Georgia Tech Yellow Jackets women's basketball team =

Intercollegiate basketball season

2022–23 Georgia Tech Yellow Jackets women's basketball
- Conference: Atlantic Coast Conference
- Record: 13–17 (4–14 ACC)
- Head coach: Nell Fortner (4th season)
- Assistant coaches: Tasha Butts; Blanche Alverson; LaSondra Barrett
- Home arena: McCamish Pavilion

2022–23 ACC women's basketball standings
| | Conf. | | | | Overall |
| Team | W | | L | PCT | W | | L | PCT |
|---|---|---|---|---|---|---|---|---|
| No. 10т Notre Dame | 15 | – | 3 | .833 | 27 | – | 6 | .818 |
| No. 13 Duke | 14 | – | 4 | .778 | 26 | – | 7 | .788 |
| No. 4 Virginia Tech † | 14 | – | 4 | .778 | 31 | – | 4 | .886 |
| Louisville | 12 | – | 6 | .667 | 26 | – | 12 | .684 |
| Florida State | 12 | – | 6 | .667 | 23 | – | 10 | .697 |
| Miami (FL) | 11 | – | 7 | .611 | 22 | – | 13 | .629 |
| No. 20 North Carolina | 11 | – | 7 | .611 | 22 | – | 11 | .667 |
| NC State | 9 | – | 9 | .500 | 20 | – | 12 | .625 |
| Syracuse | 9 | – | 9 | .500 | 20 | – | 13 | .606 |
| Clemson | 7 | – | 11 | .389 | 19 | – | 16 | .543 |
| Boston College | 5 | – | 13 | .278 | 16 | – | 17 | .485 |
| Wake Forest | 5 | – | 13 | .278 | 17 | – | 17 | .500 |
| Virginia | 4 | – | 14 | .222 | 15 | – | 15 | .500 |
| Georgia Tech | 4 | – | 14 | .222 | 13 | – | 17 | .433 |
| Pittsburgh | 3 | – | 15 | .167 | 10 | – | 20 | .333 |
† 2023 ACC tournament winner As of March 27, 2023; Rankings from AP poll

The 2022–23 Georgia Tech Yellow Jackets women's basketball team represented the Georgia Institute of Technology during the 2022–23 NCAA Division I women's basketball season. They were led by fourth-year head coach Nell Fortner and played their home games at McCamish Pavilion as members of the Atlantic Coast Conference (ACC).

The Yellow Jackets finished the season 13–17 overall and 4–14 in ACC play, to finish in a tie for thirteenth place. As the fourteenth seed in the ACC tournament, they lost their first-round matchup with Boston College. They were not invited to the NCAA tournament or the WNIT.

== Previous season ==
The Yellow Jackets finished the season 21–11 overall and 11–7 in ACC play, to finish in sixth place. As the sixth seed in the ACC tournament, they defeated Wake Forest in the second round before losing to Notre Dame in the quarterfinals. They received an at-large bid to the NCAA tournament where they were the ninth seed in the Spokane Regional. They lost their first-round matchup against Kansas to end their season.

== Off-season ==
=== Departures ===
Departures
| Name | Number | Pos. | Height | Year | Hometown | Reason for departure |
|---|---|---|---|---|---|---|
| Loyal McQueen | 00 | G | 5'8" | Sophomore | Florence, SC | Transferred to Alabama |
| Sarah Bates | 3 | G | 5'9" | (redshirt) Senior | McDonough, GA | Graduated |
| Elizabete Bulane | 10 | G | 5'7" | Freshman | Ādaži, Latvia | — |
| Kondalia Montgomery | 12 | G | 5'7" | Junior | Tacoma, WA | — |
| Lorela Cubaj | 13 | G | 6'4" | Graduate student | Terni, Italy | Graduated; selected 18th overall in the 2022 WNBA draft |
| Lotta-Maj Lahtinen | 31 | G | 5'7" | Senior | Helsinki, Finland | Graduated |
| Kierra Fletcher | 41 | G | 5'9" | Graduate student | Warren, MI | Graduated |
| Digna Strautmane | 45 | F | 6'2" | Graduate student | Riga, Latvia | Graduated |

=== Incoming transfers ===
Incoming transfers
| Name | Number | Pos. | Height | Year | Hometown | Previous school |
|---|---|---|---|---|---|---|
| Cameron Swartz | 1 | G | 5'11" | Graduate student | Marietta, GA | Boston College |
| Bianca Jackson | 10 | G | 5'11" | Graduate student | Montgomery, AL | Florida State |
| Kayla Blackshear | 13 | F | 6'1" | Sophomore | Orlando, FL | Alabama |

=== Recruiting class ===
College recruiting
| Name | Hometown | School | Height | Weight | Commit date |
|---|---|---|---|---|---|
| Tonie Morgan; G | Tallahassee, FL | Florida High | 5 ft 9 in (1.75 m) | N/A | |
| Tonie Morgan; G | Recruit ratings: ESPN: (95) | | | | |
| Kara Dunn; G | Dallas, GA | Mount Paran Christian School | 5 ft 11 in (1.80 m) | N/A | |
| Kara Dunn; G | Recruit ratings: ESPN: (94) | | | | |
| Paris Miller; G | Johns Creek, GA | Johns Creek High School | 5 ft 9 in (1.75 m) | N/A | |
| Paris Miller; G | Recruit ratings: ESPN: (90) | | | | |
| Raven Boswell; G | Austin, TX | Lake Travis High School | 5 ft 11 in (1.80 m) | N/A | |
| Raven Boswell; G | Recruit ratings: No ratings found | | | | |
| Inés Noguero Outeiral; G | Gijón, Spain | Joaquín Blume | 5 ft 9 in (1.75 m) | N/A | |
| Inés Noguero Outeiral; G | Recruit ratings: No ratings found | | | | |
Overall recruit ranking:
Note: In many cases, Scout, Rivals, 247Sports, On3, and ESPN may conflict in their listings of height and weight.; In these cases, the average was taken. ESPN grades are on a 100-point scale.; Sources:

== Roster ==
2022–23 Georgia Tech Yellow Jackets women's basketball team
Players
Coaches

| Pos. | # | Name | Height | Year | Previous school | Hometown |
|---|---|---|---|---|---|---|
| G | 1 | Cameron Swartz | 5 ft 11 in (1.8 m) | GS | Fellowship Christian; Boston College | Marietta, GA |
| G | 4 | Anisa Clark | 5 ft 7 in (1.7 m) | Jr | Union Grove | McDonough, GA |
| G | 5 | Tonie Morgan | 5 ft 9 in (1.75 m) | Fr | Florida High | Tallahassee, FL |
| G | 10 | Bianca Jackson | 5 ft 11 in (1.8 m) | RS Sr | Montgomery, AL; Florida State |
| F | 11 | Aixa Wone Aranaz | 6 ft 3 in (1.91 m) | Sr | Ohio State | Pamplona, Spain |
| F | 13 | Kayla Blackshear | 6 ft 1 in (1.85 m) | So | Lake Highland Preparatory School; Alabama | Orlando, FL |
| G | 14 | Raeven Boswell | 5 ft 11 in (1.8 m) | Fr | Lake Travis | Austin, TX |
| G | 15 | Avyonce Carter | 5 ft 10 in (1.78 m) | Jr | Wesleyan | Norcross, GA |
| C | 20 | Nerea Hermosa | 6 ft 5 in (1.96 m) | Sr | IES Joaquim Blume | Victoria, Spain |
| G | 22 | Inés Noguero Outeiral | 5 ft 9 in (1.75 m) | Fr | Joaquín Blume | Gijón, Spain |
| G/F | 24 | Eylia Love | 6 ft 1 in (1.85 m) | Jr | Olathe North | Kansas City, MO |
| G | 25 | Kara Dunn | 5 ft 11 in (1.8 m) | Fr | Mount Paran Christian | Dallas, GA |
| F | 33 | Carmyn Harrison | 6 ft 2 in (1.88 m) | So | Hutchison School | Memphis, TN |

Head coach

- Nell Fortner (Texas)

Assistant coach(es)

- Tasha Butts (Tennessee)
- Blanche Alverson (Auburn)
- LaSondra Barrett (LSU)

Legend

- (C) Team captain
- (S) Suspended
- (I) Ineligible
- (W) Walk-on
- Injured
- Current redshirt

Roster
Last update: October 17, 2022

== Schedule ==
| Date time, TV | Rank^{#} | Opponent^{#} | Result | Record | Site (attendance) city, state |
Exhibition
| November 3, 2022*; 7:00 p.m. | | Clayton State | W 69–62 | – | McCamish Pavilion (504); Atlanta, GA |
Regular Season
| November 10, 2022*; 7:00 p.m., ACCNX | | Georgia State | W 60–42 | 1–0 | McCamish Pavilion (1,337); Atlanta, GA |
| November 13, 2022*; 2:00 p.m., ACCNX | | Kennesaw State | W 65–39 | 2–0 | McCamish Pavilion (1,334); Atlanta, GA |
| November 16, 2022*; 8:00 p.m., SECN+ | | at Auburn | W 57–51 | 3–0 | Neville Arena (1,932); Auburn, AL |
| November 20, 2022*; 2:00 p.m., ACCN | | Georgia; Rivalry | L 52–66 | 3–1 | McCamish Pavilion (2,384); Atlanta, GA |
| November 25, 2022*; 7:30 p.m., FloHoops | | vs. South Florida; Gulf Coast Showcase quarterfinals | L 50–63 | 3–2 | Hertz Arena (275); Estero, FL |
| November 26, 2022*; 1:30 p.m., FloHoops | | vs. Air Force; Gulf Coast Showcase 2nd round | W 65–59 | 4–2 | Hertz Arena (215); Estero, FL |
| November 27, 2022*; 1:30 p.m., FloHoops | | vs. Belmont; Gulf Coast Showcase 5th-place game | W 58–52 | 5–2 | Hertz Arena (143); Estero, FL |
| December 1, 2022*; 8:00 p.m., BTN | | at Michigan State; ACC–Big Ten Women's Challenge | W 66–63 | 6–2 | Breslin Center (2,748); East Lansing, MI |
| December 4, 2022*; 3:00 p.m., ESPN+ | | at Belmont | W 59–55 | 7–2 | Curb Event Center (1,048); Nashville, TN |
| December 11, 2022*; 1:00 p.m., ACCNX | | Central Michigan | W 71–45 | 8–2 | McCamish Pavilion (1,504); Atlanta, GA |
| December 18, 2022; 1:00 p.m., ACCRSN | | at Boston College | L 62–74 | 8–3 (0–1) | Conte Forum (707); Chestnut Hill, MA |
| December 21, 2022*; 1:00 p.m., ACCNX | | Furman | W 82–41 | 9–3 | McCamish Pavilion (1,410); Atlanta, GA |
| December 29, 2022; 7:00 p.m., ACCNX | | at Virginia | L 63–69 | 9–4 (0–2) | John Paul Jones Arena (3,749); Charlottesville, VA |
| January 1, 2023; 2:00 p.m., ACCNX | | Florida State | L 58–99 | 9–5 (0–3) | McCamish Pavilion (1,731); Atlanta, GA |
| January 5, 2023; 8:00 p.m., ACCN | | at Louisville | L 55–63 | 9–6 (0–4) | KFC Yum! Center (7,633); Louisville, KY |
| January 8, 2023; 2:00 p.m., ACCNX | | at Wake Forest | L 50–51 | 9–7 (0–5) | LJVM Coliseum; Winston-Salem, NC |
| January 12, 2023; 8:00 p.m., ACCN | | Miami (FL) | L 60–69 | 9–8 (0–6) | McCamish Pavilion (1,434); Atlanta, GA |
| January 15, 2023; 4:00 p.m., ACCN | | No. 16 Duke | L 47–65 | 9–9 (0–7) | McCamish Pavilion (2,342); Atlanta, GA |
| January 19, 2023; 7:00 p.m., ACCNX | | Syracuse | W 69–57 | 10–9 (1–7) | McCamish Pavilion (1,920); Atlanta, GA |
| January 22, 2023; 4:00 p.m., ACCN | | at No. 17 North Carolina | L 57–70 | 10–10 (1–8) | Carmichael Arena (4,418); Chapel Hill, NC |
| January 26, 2023; 7:00 p.m., ACCNX | | Clemson | W 85–74 | 11–10 (2–8) | McCamish Pavilion (1,454); Atlanta, GA |
| February 2, 2023; 8:00 p.m., ACCN | | No. 15 NC State | W 68–62 | 12–10 (3–8) | McCamish Pavilion (1,653); Atlanta, GA |
| February 5, 2023; 12:00 p.m., ACCN | | at Miami (FL) | L 58–64 | 12–11 (3–9) | Watsco Center (3,686); Coral Gables, FL |
| February 9, 2023; 8:00 p.m., ACCRSN | | at Clemson | L 41–57 | 12–12 (3–10) | Littlejohn Coliseum (907); Clemson, SC |
| February 12, 2023; 2:00 p.m., ACCNX | | Pittsburgh | L 79–85 ^{2OT} | 12–13 (3–11) | McCamish Pavilion (1,661); Atlanta, GA |
| February 16, 2023; 7:00 p.m., ACCNX | | Wake Forest | W 63–55 | 13–13 (4–11) | McCamish Pavilion (1,221); Atlanta, GA |
| February 19, 2023; 2:00 p.m., ACC | | at No. 24 Florida State | L 66–80 | 13–14 (4–12) | Donald L. Tucker Center (2,990); Tallahassee, FL |
| February 23, 2023; 6:00 p.m., ACCRSN | | at No. 10 Notre Dame | L 53–76 | 13–15 (4–13) | Purcell Pavilion (5,297); Notre Dame, IN |
| February 26, 2023; 4:00 p.m., ACCN | | No. 9 Virginia Tech | L 52–65 | 13–16 (4–14) | McCamish Pavilion (2,014); Atlanta, GA |
ACC women's tournament
| March 1, 2023; 6:30 p.m., ACCN | (14) | vs. (11) Boston College; First round | L 57–62 | 13–17 | Greensboro Coliseum (3,879); Greensboro, NC |
*Non-conference game. ^{#}Rankings from AP poll. (#) Tournament seedings in parentheses. All times are in Eastern.

== Rankings ==
Regular-season polls
| Poll | Pre- Season | Week 2 | Week 3 | Week 4 | Week 5 | Week 6 | Week 7 | Week 8 | Week 9 | Week 10 | Week 11 | Week 12 | Week 13 | Week 14 | Week 15 | Week 16 | Week 17 | Week 18 | Final |
|---|---|---|---|---|---|---|---|---|---|---|---|---|---|---|---|---|---|---|---|
| AP | | | | | | | | | | | | | | | | | | | N/A |
| Coaches | | | | | | | | | | | | | | | | | | | |

Note: The AP does not release a final poll.

Legend
| | Increase in ranking |
| | Decrease in ranking |
| | Not ranked previous week |
| (RV) | Received votes |

== See also ==
- 2022–23 Georgia Tech Yellow Jackets men's basketball team
