= 2023 ACC women's basketball tournament =

American collegiate sports tournament

- Classification: Division I
- Season: 2022–23
- Teams: 15
- Site: Greensboro Coliseum; Greensboro, North Carolina
- Champions: Virginia Tech (1st title)
- Winning coach: Kenny Brooks (1st title)
- MVP: Georgia Amoore (Virginia Tech)
- Attendance: 44,391
- Television: ACC Network & ESPN

2022–23 ACC women's basketball standings
	Conf.				Overall
Team	W		L	PCT	W		L	PCT
No. 10т Notre Dame	15	–	3	.833	27	–	6	.818
No. 13 Duke	14	–	4	.778	26	–	7	.788
No. 4 Virginia Tech †	14	–	4	.778	31	–	4	.886
Louisville	12	–	6	.667	26	–	12	.684
Florida State	12	–	6	.667	23	–	10	.697
Miami (FL)	11	–	7	.611	22	–	13	.629
No. 20 North Carolina	11	–	7	.611	22	–	11	.667
NC State	9	–	9	.500	20	–	12	.625
Syracuse	9	–	9	.500	20	–	13	.606
Clemson	7	–	11	.389	19	–	16	.543
Boston College	5	–	13	.278	16	–	17	.485
Wake Forest	5	–	13	.278	17	–	17	.500
Virginia	4	–	14	.222	15	–	15	.500
Georgia Tech	4	–	14	.222	13	–	17	.433
Pittsburgh	3	–	15	.167	10	–	20	.333
† 2023 ACC tournament winner As of March 27, 2023; Rankings from AP poll

The 2023 ACC women's basketball tournament concluded the 2022-23 season of the Atlantic Coast Conference, and was held at the Greensboro Coliseum in Greensboro, North Carolina, from March 1–5, 2023. The 2023 edition marked the 23rd time in 24 years that the tournament was held in Greensboro. The winner received the ACC's automatic bid to the 2023 NCAA Division I Women's Basketball Tournament.

== Seeds ==
All 15 ACC teams participated in the tournament. Teams were seeded by record within the conference, with a tiebreaker system to seed teams with identical conference records. The top four seeds received double byes, while seeds 5 through 9 received single byes. Seedings were finalized on February 26, 2023, after the final day of regular season play, with Notre Dame finishing in first place and earning the top seed.

Seed	School	Conference Record	Tiebreaker
1	Notre Dame‡†	15–3	
2	Duke†	14–4	1–1 vs. Virginia Tech; 1–0 vs. Notre Dame
3	Virginia Tech†	14–4	1–1 vs. Duke; 0–1 vs. Notre Dame
4	Louisville†	12–6	1–0 vs. Florida State
5	Florida State#	12–6	0-1 vs. Louisville
6	Miami#	11–7	1–0 vs. North Carolina
7	North Carolina#	11–7	0–1 vs. Miami
8	NC State#	9–9	1–0 vs. Syracuse
9	Syracuse#	9–9	0–1 vs. NC State
10	Clemson	7–11	
11	Boston College	5–13	1–0 vs. Wake Forest
12	Wake Forest	5–13	0–1 vs. Boston College
13	Virginia	4–14	1–0 vs. Georgia Tech
14	Georgia Tech	4–14	0–1 vs. Virginia
15	Pittsburgh	3–15	
‡ – ACC regular season champions. † – Received a double-bye in the conference tournament. # – Received a single-bye in the conference tournament.

== Schedule ==
Session	Game	Time	Matchup	Score	Television	Attendance
First round – Wednesday, March 1
Opening day	1	1:00 p.m.	No. 12 Wake Forest vs. No. 13 Virginia	68–57	ACCN	3,859
Opening day	2	3:30 p.m.	No. 10 Clemson vs. No. 15 Pittsburgh	71–53	ACCN	3,859
Opening day	3	6:30 p.m.	No. 11 Boston College vs. No. 14 Georgia Tech	62–57	ACCN	3,879
Second round – Thursday, March 2
1	4	11:00 a.m.	No. 5 Florida State vs. No. 12 Wake Forest	54–65	ACCN	4,177
1	5	2:00 p.m.	No. 8 NC State vs. No. 9 Syracuse	83–58	ACCN	4,177
2	6	6:00 p.m.	No. 7 North Carolina vs. No. 10 Clemson	68–58	ACCN	4,578
2	7	8:00 p.m.	No. 6 Miami vs. No. 11 Boston College	84–69	ACCN	4,578
Quarterfinals – Friday, March 3
3	8	11:00 a.m.	No. 4 Louisville vs. No. 12 Wake Forest	74–48	ACCN	6,151
3	9	2:00 p.m.	No. 1 Notre Dame vs. No. 8 NC State	66–60	ACCN	6,151
4	10	6:00 p.m.	No. 2 Duke vs. No. 7 North Carolina	44–40	ACCN	7,823
4	11	8:00 p.m.	No. 3 Virginia Tech vs. No. 6 Miami	68–42	ACCN	7,823
Semifinals – Saturday, March 4
5	12	Noon	No. 1 Notre Dame vs. No. 4 Louisville	38–64	ACCN	7,122
5	13	2:30 p.m.	No. 2 Duke vs. No. 3 Virginia Tech	37–58	ACCN	7,122
Championship – Sunday, March 5
6	14	Noon	No. 3 Virginia Tech vs. No. 4 Louisville	75–67	ESPN	6,802
Game times in EST. Rankings denote tournament seed.

== Bracket ==
First round Wednesday, March 1
12	Wake Forest	68
13	Virginia	57
10	Clemson	71
15	Pittsburgh	53
11	Boston College	62
14	Georgia Tech	57

Second round Thursday, March 2
8	NC State	83
9	Syracuse	58
5	Florida State	54
12	Wake Forest	65
7	North Carolina	68
10	Clemson	58
6	Miami	84
11	Boston College	69

Quarterfinals; Friday, March 3
1	Notre Dame	66
8	NC State	60
4	Louisville	74
12	Wake Forest	48
2	Duke	44
7	North Carolina	40
3	Virginia Tech	68
6	Miami	42

Semifinals; Saturday, March 4
1	Notre Dame	38
4	Louisville	64
2	Duke	37
3	Virginia Tech	58

Championship; Sunday, March 5
4	Louisville	67
3	Virginia Tech	75

* – Denotes overtime period

== Game summaries ==
=== First round ===
ACCN

March 1
1:00 p.m. EST

Report

No. 12 Wake Forest 68, No. 13 Virginia 57
Scoring by quarter: 19–8, 9–17, 28–16, 12–16
Pts: Spear (19); Rebs: Hinds (11); Asts: Becker/Harrison/Williams (3)	Pts: Taylor (19); Rebs: Taylor (8); Asts: Dale/Smith (3)

Greensboro Coliseum
Greensboro, NC
Referees: Bruce Morris
Karen Preato
Denise Brooks

ACCN

March 1
3:30 p.m. EST

Report

No. 10 Clemson 71, No. 15 Pittsburgh 53
Scoring by quarter: 14–16, 19–4, 17–16, 21–17
Pts: Hank (19); Rebs: Robinson (8); Asts: Bradford (6)	Pts: Brown (16); Rebs: King (9); Asts: Harris (3)

Greensboro Coliseum
Greensboro, NC
Attendance: 3,859
Referees: Maj Forsberg
Pualani Spurlock-Welsh
Katie Lukanich

ACCN

March 1
6:30 p.m. EST

Report

No. 11 Boston College 62, No. 14 Georgia Tech 57
Scoring by quarter: 9–12, 18–6, 16–12, 19–27
Pts: Waggoner (16); Rebs: Mair (10); Asts: Mair (7)	Pts: Jackson (19); Rebs: Morgan (6); Asts: Morgan (4)

Greensboro Coliseum
Greensboro, NC
Attendance: 3,879
Referees: Eric Brewton
Dee Kantner
Talisa Green

=== Second round ===
ACCN

March 2
11:00 a.m. EST

Report

No. 5 Florida State 54, No. 12 Wake Forest 65
Scoring by quarter: 21–14, 13–2, 8–29, 12–20
Pts: Timpson (14); Rebs: Timpson (9); Asts: Gordon (3)	Pts: Spear (19); Rebs: Hinds (9)/Summiel (9); Asts: Summiel (5)

Greensboro Coliseum
Greensboro, NC
Referees: Carla Fountain
Rod Creech
Talisa Green

ACCN

March 2
2:00 p.m. EST

Report

No. 8 NC State 83, No. 9 Syracuse 58
Scoring by quarter: 17–12, 15–14, 23–18, 28–14
Pts: Brown-Turner (16); Rebs: Brown-Turner (7); Asts: James (5)	Pts: Hyman (15); Rebs: Lewis (6); Asts: Fair (6)

Greensboro Coliseum
Greensboro, NC
Attendance: 4,177
Referees: Maj Forsberg
Denise Brooks
Jeffrey Smith

ACCN

March 2
6:00 p.m. EST

Report

No. 7 North Carolina 68, No. 10 Clemson 58
Scoring by quarter: 24–19, 16–13, 13–14, 15–12
Pts: Robinson (27); Rebs: Whitehorn (8); Asts: Perpiganan (5)	Pts: Ustby (15); Rebs: Poole/Ustby (6); Asts: Ustby/Hodgson (4)

Greensboro Coliseum
Greensboro, NC
Referees: Eric Brewton
Dee Kantner
Fatou Cissoko-Stephens

ACCN

March 2
8:00 p.m. EST

Report

No. 6 Miami 84, No. 11 Boston College 69
Scoring by quarter: 14–16, 25–22, 21–18, 24–13
Pts: Dwyer (19); Rebs: Harden (9); Asts: Pendande/Roberts/Hal. Cavinder/Erjavec (3)	Pts: Todd (14); Rebs: Gakdeng/Waggoner (5); Asts: Mair (7)

Greensboro Coliseum
Greensboro, NC
Attendance: 4,578
Referees: Pualani Spurlock-Welsh
Mark Resch
Tiara Cruse

=== Quarterfinals ===
ACCN

March 3
11:00 a.m. EST

Report

No. 4 Louisville 74, No. 12 Wake Forest 48
Scoring by quarter: 20–8, 14–16, 19–11, 21–13
Pts: Van Lith (26); Rebs: Harris (9); Asts: Robinson (10)	Pts: Williams (16); Rebs: Williams (10); Asts: Andrews/Hinds/Spear (2)

Greensboro Coliseum
Greensboro, NC
Referees: Katie Lukanich
Billy Smith
Karen Preato

ACCN

March 3
2:00 p.m. EST

Report

No. 1 Notre Dame 66, No. 8 NC State 60
Scoring by quarter: 14–18, 11–4, 19–15, 22–23
Pts: Citron (28); Rebs: Westbeld (10); Asts: Citron (5)	Pts: Rivers/James (14); Rebs: James/Collins (5); Asts: Rivers (5)

Greensboro Coliseum
Greensboro, NC
Attendance: 6,151
Referees: Talisa Green
Tiara Cruse
Rod Creech

ACCN

March 3
6:00 p.m. EST

Report

No. 2 Duke 44, No. 7 North Carolina 40
Scoring by quarter: 9–8, 10–16, 15–12, 10–4
Pts: Balogun (11); Rebs: Heide (8); Asts: Day-Wilson (3)	Pts: Kelly (11); Rebs: Poole/Todd-Williams (6); Asts: Ustby/Kelly (3)

Greensboro Coliseum
Greensboro, NC
Referees: Mark Resch
Angelica Suffren
Denise Brooks

ACCN

March 3
8:00 p.m. EST

Report

No. 3 Virginia Tech 68, No. 6 Miami 42
Scoring by quarter: 20–5, 9–10, 22–12, 17–15
Pts: Kitley (22); Rebs: Gregg (13); Asts: Soule (5)	Pts: Hanna Cavinder (7); Rebs: Roberts (8); Asts: Han. Cavinder/Erjavec (2)

Greensboro Coliseum
Greensboro, NC
Attendance: 7,823
Referees: Fatou Cissoko-Stephens
Carla Fountain
Joseph Vaszily

=== Semifinals ===
ACCN

March 4
Noon EST

Report

No. 1 Notre Dame 38, No. 4 Louisville 64
Scoring by quarter: 7–12, 8–17, 9–21, 14–14
Pts: Westbeld (9); Rebs: Ebo/Prosper (5); Asts: Bransford/Citron (3)	Pts: Van Lith (15); Rebs: Cochran/Robinson (8); Asts: Robinson (5)

Greensboro Coliseum
Greensboro, NC
Referees: Carla Fountain
Joseph Vaszily
Angelica Suffren

ACCN

March 4
2:30 p.m. EST

Report

No. 2 Duke 37, No. 3 Virginia Tech 58
Scoring by quarter: 9–13, 9–23, 12–12, 7–10
Pts: Balogun (9); Rebs: Corosdale (5); Asts: Day-Wilson/Richardson (2)	Pts: Amoore (24); Rebs: Kitley (11); Asts: Amoore (7)

Greensboro Coliseum
Greensboro, NC
Attendance: 7,122
Referees: Rod Creech
Karen Preato
Billy Smith

=== Final ===
ESPN

March 5
1:00 p.m. EST

Report

No. 3 Virginia Tech 75, No. 4 Louisville 67
Scoring by quarter: 21–14, 17–14, 13–16, 24–23
Pts: Amoore (25); Rebs: King (7); Asts: Amoore/Traylor (4)	Pts: Carr (27); Rebs: Robinson (9); Asts: Carr (3)

Greensboro Coliseum
Greensboro, NC
Attendance: 6,802
Referees: Dee Kantner
Maj Forsberg
Pualani Spurlock-Welsh

== All-Tournament Teams ==
2023 ACC Women's Basketball All-Tournament Teams
First Team	Second Team
Georgia Amoore – Virginia Tech (MVP) Elizabeth Kitley – Virginia Tech Hailey Van Lith – Louisville Mykasa Robinson – Louisville Chrisyln Carr – Louisville	Sonia Citron – Notre Dame Jewel Spear – Wake Forest Taylor Soule – Virginia Tech Amari Robinson – Clemson Olivia Cochran – Louisville

== See also ==
- 2023 ACC men's basketball tournament
