= 2022–23 Clemson Tigers women's basketball team =

Women's college basketball season

2022–23 Clemson Tigers women's basketball
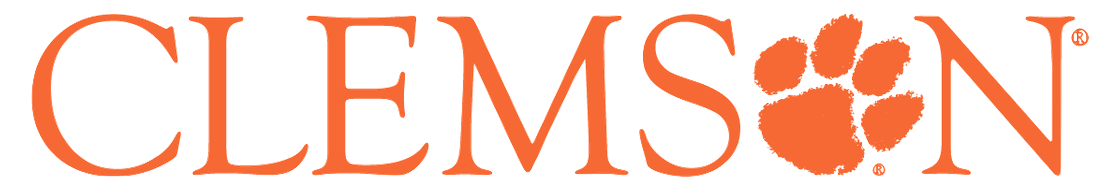

WNIT, Super 16
- Conference: Atlantic Coast Conference
- Record: 19–16 (7–11 ACC)
- Head coach: Amanda Butler (5th season)
- Assistant coaches: Joy Smith (5th season); Daniel Barber (5th season); Priscilla Edwards (2nd season)
- Home arena: Littlejohn Coliseum

2022–23 ACC women's basketball standings
	Conf.				Overall
Team	W		L	PCT	W		L	PCT
No. 10т Notre Dame	15	–	3	.833	27	–	6	.818
No. 13 Duke	14	–	4	.778	26	–	7	.788
No. 4 Virginia Tech †	14	–	4	.778	31	–	4	.886
Louisville	12	–	6	.667	26	–	12	.684
Florida State	12	–	6	.667	23	–	10	.697
Miami (FL)	11	–	7	.611	22	–	13	.629
No. 20 North Carolina	11	–	7	.611	22	–	11	.667
NC State	9	–	9	.500	20	–	12	.625
Syracuse	9	–	9	.500	20	–	13	.606
Clemson	7	–	11	.389	19	–	16	.543
Boston College	5	–	13	.278	16	–	17	.485
Wake Forest	5	–	13	.278	17	–	17	.500
Virginia	4	–	14	.222	15	–	15	.500
Georgia Tech	4	–	14	.222	13	–	17	.433
Pittsburgh	3	–	15	.167	10	–	20	.333
† 2023 ACC tournament winner As of March 27, 2023; Rankings from AP poll

The 2022–23 Clemson Tigers women's basketball team represented Clemson University during the 2022–23 college basketball season. The Tigers were led by fifth year head coach Amanda Butler. The Tigers, members of the Atlantic Coast Conference, played their home games at Littlejohn Coliseum.

The Tigers finished the season 19–16 and 7–11 in ACC play to finish in tenth place. As the tenth seed in the ACC tournament, they defeated fifteenth seed Pittsburgh in the First Round before losing to seventh seed North Carolina in the Second Round. They received an at-large invitation to the WNIT. The Tigers defeated High Point in the First Round and Auburn in the Second Round before losing to Florida in the Super 16 to end their season.

== Previous season ==
The Tigers finished the season 10–21 and 3–15 in ACC play to finish in thirteenth place. In the ACC tournament, they defeated twelfth seeded Syracuse in the First Round before losing to fifth seed Virginia Tech in the Second Round. They were not invited to the NCAA tournament or the WNIT.

== Offseason ==
=== Departures ===
Departures
Name	Number	Pos.	Height	Year	Hometown	Reason for departure
Delicia Washington	00	G	5'10"	Graduate Student	Macclenny, Florida	Graduated
Skylar Blackstock	21	F	5'11"	Senior	Mount Pleasant, South Carolina	Graduated
Latrese Saine	40	C	6'4"	Graduate Student	West Memphis, Arkansas	Graduated

=== Incoming transfers ===
Incoming transfers
Name	Number	Pos.	Height	Year	Hometown	Previous school
Brie Perpignan	0	G	5'8"	Graduate Student	Upper Marlboro, Maryland	Elon
Ale’Jah Douglas	24	G	5'6"	Junior	Omaha, Nebraska	Western Nebraska Community College

=== 2022 recruiting class ===
College recruiting information
Name	Hometown	School	Height	Weight	Commit date
Ruby Whitehorn; G	Detroit, Michigan	Detroit Edison	6 ft 0 in (1.83 m)	N/A	
Ruby Whitehorn; G	Recruit ratings: ESPN: (97)				
Tadassa Brown; F	Lansing, MI	Columbia Central	6 ft 3 in (1.91 m)	N/A	
Tadassa Brown; F	Recruit ratings: No ratings found				
Overall recruit ranking:
Note: In many cases, Scout, Rivals, 247Sports, On3, and ESPN may conflict in their listings of height and weight.; In these cases, the average was taken. ESPN grades are on a 100-point scale.; Sources:

== Roster ==
2022–23 Clemson Tigers women's basketball team
Players
Coaches

Pos.	#	Name	Height	Year	Previous school	Hometown
G	0	Brie Perpignan	5 ft 8 in (1.73 m)	GS	Bishop O'Connell; Elon	Upper Marlboro, MD
G	1	Taylor Thompson	5 ft 7 in (1.7 m)	Jr	Eastside	Greenville, SC
G	2	Daisha Bradford	5 ft 9 in (1.75 m)	Sr	Jones College	Mobile, AL
F	3	Makayla Elmore	6 ft 3 in (1.91 m)	So	Hopewell-Loudon	Fostoria, OH
G	4	Weronika Hipp	5 ft 8 in (1.73 m)	Jr	Eagle's Landing Christian Academy	Ostrów Wielkopolski, Poland
F	5	Amari Robinson	6 ft 0 in (1.83 m)	Sr	Douglas County	Douglasville, GA
F	11	Tadassa Brown	6 ft 3 in (1.91 m)	Fr	Columbia Central	Lansing, MI
F	12	Hannah Hank	6 ft 2 in (1.88 m)	Sr	Forestville	Port Lincoln, Australia
G	15	Kionna Gaines	5 ft 9 in (1.75 m)	So	Carver	Columbus, GA
C	21	Eno Inyang	6 ft 3 in (1.91 m)	So	Saint Cloud	St. Cloud, FL
G	22	Ruby Whitehorn	6 ft 0 in (1.83 m)	Fr	Detroit Edison	Detroit, MI
G	24	Ale'Jah Douglas	5 ft 6 in (1.68 m)	Jr	Western Nebraska CC	Omaha, NE
G	25	Sydney Standifer	5 ft 7 in (1.7 m)	So	Argyle	Argyle, TX
G	30	Madi Ott	5 ft 10 in (1.78 m)	So	Frisco Centennial	Frisco, TX

Head coach

- Amanda Butler (Florida)

Assistant coach(es)

- Joy Smith (Duke)
- Daniel Barber (Florida)
- Priscilla Edwards (St. Bonaventure)

Legend

- (C) Team captain
- (S) Suspended
- (I) Ineligible
- (W) Walk-on
- Injured
- Current redshirt

Roster
Last update: November 7, 2022

== Schedule ==
Date time, TV	Rank^{#}	Opponent^{#}	Result	Record	High points	High rebounds	High assists	Site (attendance) city, state
Regular Season
November 7, 2022*; 11:00 a.m., ACCNX		Gardner–Webb	W 81–54	1–0	17 – Whitehorn	9 – Whitehorn	4 – Tied	Littlejohn Coliseum (1,342); Clemson, SC
November 10, 2022*; 7:00 p.m., ACCNX		Wofford	W 79–68	2–0	16 – Ott	10 – Bradford	5 – Bradford	Littlejohn Coliseum (783); Clemson, SC
November 13, 2022*; 2:00 p.m., ACCNX		Richmond	W 61–40	3–0	18 – Robinson	8 – Tied	3 – Bradford	Littlejohn Coliseum (857); Clemson, SC
November 17, 2022*; 6:00 p.m., ACCN		No. 1 South Carolina; Rivalry	L 31–85	3–1	9 – Robinson	7 – Whitehorn	3 – Perpignan	Littlejohn Coliseum (3,051); Clemson, SC
November 24, 2022*; 8:00 p.m., ESPN3		vs. No. 25 Kansas State; Paradise Jam	L 38–76	3–2	8 – Whitehorn	5 – Tied	2 – Perpignan	Sports and Fitness Center (1,024); Saint Thomas, USVI
November 25, 2022*; 8:00 p.m., ESPN3		vs. Arkansas; Paradise Jam	L 62–76	3–3	13 – Douglas	9 – Hank	4 – Perpignan	Sports and Fitness Center (1,724); Saint Thomas, USVI
November 26, 2022*; 5:45 p.m., ESPN3		vs. Northern Arizona; Paradise Jam	W 80–62	4–3	29 – Whitehorn	8 – Robinson	2 – Tied	Sports and Fitness Center; Saint Thomas, USVI
December 1, 2022*; 7:00 p.m., ESPN+		at Charleston Southern	W 84–31	5–3	14 – Tied	9 – Robinson	4 – Tied	North Charleston Coliseum (602); Charleston, SC
December 4, 2022*; 2:00 p.m., ESPN+		at Georgia State	W 85–58	6–3	14 – Ott	5 – Tied	6 – Robinson	GSU Sports Arena (677); Atlanta, GA
December 8, 2022*; 7:00 p.m., ACCNX		Charlotte	W 79–54	7–3	22 – Robinson	7 – Tied	6 – Perpignan	Littlejohn Coliseum (623); Clemson, SC
December 10, 2022*; 2:00 p.m., ACCNX		Western Carolina	W 81–42	8–3	22 – Bradford	11 – Robinson	8 – Whitehorn	Littlejohn Coliseum (854); Clemson, SC
December 18, 2022; 6:00 p.m., ACCN		at No. 8 NC State	L 59–77	8–4 (0–1)	12 – Robinson	9 – Whitehorn	4 – Perpignan	Reynolds Coliseum (5,500); Raleigh, NC
December 20, 2022*; 1:00 p.m., ACCNX		Radford	W 81–38	9–4	22 – Perpignan	8 – Hank	3 – Tied	Littlejohn Coliseum (767); Clemson, SC
December 29, 2022; 6:00 p.m., ACCRSN		No. 7 Virginia Tech	W 64–59	10–4 (1–1)	16 – Robinson	9 – Tied	3 – Bradford	Littlejohn Coliseum (1,517); Clemson, SC
January 1, 2023; 2:00 p.m., ACCN		Wake Forest	W 60–59	11–4 (2–1)	16 – Whitehorn	8 – Hank	7 – Perpignan	Littlejohn Coliseum (958); Clemson, SC
January 5, 2023; 6:00 p.m., ACCNX		at Florida State	L 62–93	11–5 (2–2)	13 – Tied	11 – Inyang	6 – Bradford	Donald L. Tucker Center (2,009); Tallahassee, FL
January 8, 2023; 2:00 p.m., ACCNX		Syracuse	L 77–91	11–6 (2–3)	19 – Bradford	8 – Robinson	4 – Tied	Littlejohn Coliseum (906); Clemson, SC
January 12, 2023; 7:00 p.m., ACCNX		at No. 16 Duke	L 56–66	11–7 (2–4)	16 – Robinson	11 – Hank	2 – Bradford	Cameron Indoor Stadium (2,134); Durham, NC
January 15, 2023; 2:00 p.m., ACCNX		at Pittsburgh	W 72–57	12–7 (3–4)	18 – Robinson	12 – Hank	8 – Hank	Peterson Events Center (953); Pittsburgh, PA
January 19, 2023; 7:00 p.m., ACCRSN		No. 7 Notre Dame	L 54–57	12–8 (3–5)	11 – Perpignan	8 – Robinson	5 – Bradford	Littlejohn Coliseum (1,259); Clemson, SC
January 22, 2023; 2:00 p.m., ACCNX		at Boston College	W 67–57	13–8 (4–5)	17 – Bradford	9 – Hank	4 – Perpignan	Conte Forum (1,403); Chestnut Hill, MA
January 26, 2023; 7:00 p.m., ACCNX		at Georgia Tech	L 74–85	13–9 (4–6)	26 – Robinson	5 – Tied	3 – Tied	McCamish Pavilion (1,454); Atlanta, GA
January 29, 2023; 4:00 p.m., ACCN		No. 15 North Carolina	L 58–69	13–10 (4–7)	14 – Bradford	7 – Whitehorn	3 – Tied	Littlejohn Coliseum (2,556); Clemson, SC
February 2, 2023; 8:00 p.m., ACCRSN		Miami (FL)	L 66–69	13–11 (4–8)	17 – Robinson	12 – Robinson	5 – Perpignan	Littlejohn Coliseum (1,001); Clemson, SC
February 5, 2023; 4:00 p.m., ACCN		at Wake Forest	L 64–69 ^{OT}	13–12 (4–9)	19 – Perpignan	6 – Tied	3 – Tied	LJVM Coliseum (1,039); Winston-Salem, NC
February 9, 2023; 8:00 p.m., ACCRSN		Georgia Tech	W 57–41	14–12 (5–9)	15 – Robinson	10 – Hank	3 – Perpignan	Littlejohn Coliseum (907); Clemson, SC
February 12, 2023; 6:00 p.m., ACCN		at Louisville	L 69–81	14–13 (5–10)	16 – Robinson	9 – Bradford	3 – Perpignan	KFC Yum! Center (8,782); Louisville, KY
February 16, 2023; 6:00 p.m., ACCNX		at Miami (FL)	L 54–59	14–14 (5–11)	18 – Bradford	4 – Tied	4 – Tied	Watsco Center (1,923); Coral Gables, FL
February 23, 2023; 7:00 p.m., ACCNX		Virginia	W 79–69	15–14 (6–11)	18 – Robinson	9 – Hank	3 – Tied	Littlejohn Coliseum (892); Clemson, SC
February 26, 2023; 2:00 p.m., ACCN		No. 23 Florida State	W 74–61	16–14 (7–11)	20 – Robinson	7 – Bradford	7 – Perpignan	Littlejohn Coliseum (1,842); Clemson, SC
ACC Women's Tournament
March 1, 2023; 3:30 p.m., ACCN	(10)	vs. (15) Pittsburgh; First round	W 71–53	17–14	19 – Hank	8 – Robinson	6 – Bradford	Greensboro Coliseum (3,879); Greensboro, NC
March 2, 2023; 6:00 p.m., ACCN	(10)	vs. (7) No. 18 North Carolina; Second round	L 58–68	17–15	27 – Robinson	8 – Whitehorn	5 – Perpignan	Greensboro Coliseum (4,578); Greensboro, NC
WNIT
March 16, 2023; 7:00 p.m., ACCNX		High Point; First round	W 66–46	18–15	17 – Bradford	10 – Inyang	5 – Perpignan	Littlejohn Coliseum (437); Clemson, SC
March 20, 2023; 7:00 p.m., ACCNX		Auburn; Second round	W 56–55	19–15	16 – Whitehorn	11 – Hank	5 – Hank	Littlejohn Coliseum (698); Clemson, SC
March 23, 2023; 7:00 p.m., ACCNX		Florida; Super 16	L 63–73	19–16	17 – Perpignan	6 – Tied	8 – Bradford	Littlejohn Coliseum (1,103); Clemson, SC
*Non-conference game. ^{#}Rankings from AP Poll. (#) Tournament seedings in parentheses. All times are in Eastern.

== Rankings ==
Regular season polls
Poll	Pre- Season	Week 2	Week 3	Week 4	Week 5	Week 6	Week 7	Week 8	Week 9	Week 10	Week 11	Week 12	Week 13	Week 14	Week 15	Week 16	Week 17	Week 18	Final
AP																			N/A
Coaches																			

Note: The AP does not release a final poll.

Legend
	Increase in ranking
	Decrease in ranking
	Not ranked previous week
(RV)	Received Votes

== Statistics ==
Player	GP	GS	MPG	FG%	3P%	FT%	RPG	APG	PPG
Amari Robinson	35	35	28.8	49.2%	35.6%	81.3%	6.4	1.6	13.9
Daisah Bradford	35	35	28.2	37.8%	33.8%	68.3%	4.7	3.1	10.1
Ruby Whitehorn	35	33	26.6	42.0%	25.0%	64.3%	4.8	1.8	9.5
Brie Perpignan	35	31	27.4	42.8%	31.9%	73.1%	2.0	3.1	9.1
Eno Inyang	31	0	14.4	55.6%	—	75.8%	3.7	1.7	6.4
Hannah Hank	35	35	25.1	39.6%	31.2%	60.0%	6.1	1.5	5.5
Ale'Jah Douglas	33	4	17.8	39.6%	32.4%	55.3%	1.8	1.2	5.2
Madi Ott	34	1	10.4	32.6%	29.1%	83.3%	0.4	0.5	2.6
MaKayla Elmore	35	0	13.9	38.4%	29.8%	53.8%	2.9	0.5	2.5
Kionna Gaines	35	1	9.2	29.6%	16.7%	43.6%	1.7	0.5	2.4
Tadassa Brown	5	0	4.0	66.7%	—	50.0%	1.4	—	1.0
Weronika Hipp	11	0	5.9	29.4%	8.3%	0.0%	0.2	0.5	1.0
Taylor Thompson	3	0	1.3	—	—	—	—	—	—

== See also ==
- 2022–23 Clemson Tigers men's basketball team
