= 2022–23 Miami Hurricanes women's basketball team =

Intercollegiate basketball season

2022–23 Miami Hurricanes women's basketball

NCAA tournament, Elite Eight
- Conference: Atlantic Coast Conference

Ranking
- Coaches: No. 18
- Record: 22–13 (11–7 ACC)
- Head coach: Katie Meier (18th season)
- Assistant coaches: Fitzroy Anthony; Shenise Johnson; Josh Petersen
- Home arena: Watsco Center

2022–23 ACC women's basketball standings
	Conf.				Overall
Team	W		L	PCT	W		L	PCT
No. 10т Notre Dame	15	–	3	.833	27	–	6	.818
No. 13 Duke	14	–	4	.778	26	–	7	.788
No. 4 Virginia Tech †	14	–	4	.778	31	–	4	.886
Louisville	12	–	6	.667	26	–	12	.684
Florida State	12	–	6	.667	23	–	10	.697
Miami (FL)	11	–	7	.611	22	–	13	.629
No. 20 North Carolina	11	–	7	.611	22	–	11	.667
NC State	9	–	9	.500	20	–	12	.625
Syracuse	9	–	9	.500	20	–	13	.606
Clemson	7	–	11	.389	19	–	16	.543
Boston College	5	–	13	.278	16	–	17	.485
Wake Forest	5	–	13	.278	17	–	17	.500
Virginia	4	–	14	.222	15	–	15	.500
Georgia Tech	4	–	14	.222	13	–	17	.433
Pittsburgh	3	–	15	.167	10	–	20	.333
† 2023 ACC tournament winner As of March 27, 2023; Rankings from AP poll

The 2022–23 Miami Hurricanes women's basketball team represented the University of Miami during the 2022–23 NCAA Division I women's basketball season. The Hurricanes were led by eighteenth-year head coach Katie Meier and played their home games at the Watsco Center as members of the Atlantic Coast Conference.

They finished the season 22–13 overall and 11–7 in ACC play to finish in a tie for sixth place. As the sixth seed in the ACC tournament, they defeated eleventh seed Boston College in the Second Round before losing to third seeded Virginia Tech in the Quarterfinals. They received an at-large bid to the NCAA tournament where they were the ninth seed in the Greenville 2 Regional. They defeated eighth seed Oklahoma State in the First Round, first seed Indiana in the Second Round, and fourth seed Villanova in the Sweet Sixteen before losing to eventual champions third seed LSU in the Elite Eight to end their season. The Elite Eight appearance was the first in program history.

== Previous season ==
The Hurricanes finished the season 21–13 overall and 10–8 in ACC play to finish in a tie for seventh place. As the seventh seed in the ACC tournament, they defeated tenth seed Duke in the Second Round, second seeded Louisville in the Quarterfinals, and third seed Notre Dame in the Semifinals before losing to NC State in the Final. They received an at-large bid to the NCAA tournament where they were the eighth seed in the Greensboro Regional. They defeated ninth seed South Florida in the First Round before losing to top seed South Carolina in the Second Round to end their season.

== Off-season ==
=== Departures ===
Departures
Name	Number	Pos.	Height	Year	Hometown	Reason for departure
Mykea Gray	5	G	5'4"	Senior	Upper Marlboro, Maryland	Graduated
Kelsey Marshall	20	G	5'9"	Graduate Student	Davie, Florida	Graduated
Paula Fraile Ruiz	23	F	6'4"	Sophomore	Barcelona, Spain	—
Maeva Djaldi-Tabdi	33	F	6'4"	Graduate Student	Paris, France	Graduated
Naomi Mbandu	35	F	6'2"	Senior	Amiens, France	Graduated

=== Incoming transfers ===
Incoming transfers
Name	Number	Pos.	Height	Year	Hometown	Previous school
Haley Cavinder	14	G	5'6"	Senior	Gilbert, Arizona	Fresno State
Hanna Cavinder	15	G	5'6"	Senior	Gilbert, Arizona	Fresno State
Latasha Lattimore	35	F	6'4"	Sophomore	Toronto, Canada	Texas

=== Recruiting class ===
College recruiting information
Name	Hometown	School	Height	Weight	Commit date
Kyla Oldcare; F	Mason, Ohio	William Mason High School	6 ft 5 in (1.96 m)	N/A	
Kyla Oldcare; F	Recruit ratings: ESPN: (95)				
Lazaria Spearman; F	Dacula, Georgia	Dacula High School	6 ft 3 in (1.91 m)	N/A	
Lazaria Spearman; F	Recruit ratings: ESPN: (95)				
Overall recruit ranking:
Note: In many cases, Scout, Rivals, 247Sports, On3, and ESPN may conflict in their listings of height and weight.; In these cases, the average was taken. ESPN grades are on a 100-point scale.; Sources:

== Roster ==
2022–23 Miami Hurricanes women's basketball team
Players
Coaches

Pos.	#	Name	Height	Year	Previous school	Hometown
G	0	Kenza Salgues	5 ft 9 in (1.75 m)	Sr	INSEP	Montpellier, FR
G/F	1	Moulayna Sidi Baba	6 ft 0 in (1.83 m)	Sr	Solna Gymnasium	Stockholm, Sweden
F	3	Destiny Harden	6 ft 0 in (1.83 m)	GS	Morgan Park; West Virginia	Chicago, IL
G	4	Jasmyne Roberts	5 ft 10 in (1.78 m)	So	Bishop Kenny	Jacksonville, FL
G	5	Karla Erjavec	5 ft 10 in (1.78 m)	GS	Sport Gymnasium; Wyoming	Zagreb, Croatia
G	12	Ja'Leah Williams	5 ft 9 in (1.75 m)	So	Blanche Ely	Pompano Beach, FL
G	13	Lashae Dwyer	5 ft 8 in (1.73 m)	So	Webb School	Toronto, Canada
G	14	Haley Cavinder	5 ft 6 in (1.68 m)	Sr	Gilbert; Fresno State	Gilbert, AZ
G	15	Hanna Cavinder	5 ft 6 in (1.68 m)	Sr	Gilbert; Fresno State	Gilbert, AZ
F	21	Lola Pendande	6 ft 4 in (1.93 m)	Sr	Ribét Academy; Utah	Almeria, Spain
F	22	Chiso Okafor	6 ft 1 in (1.85 m)	So	IES Llavaneres	Mataró, Spain
F	32	Lazaria Spearman	6 ft 4 in (1.93 m)	Fr	Dacula	Dacula, GA
F	35	Latasha Lattimore	6 ft 4 in (1.93 m)	So	Royal Crown Academic School; Texas	Toronto, Canada
F	44	Kyla Oldcare	6 ft 6 in (1.98 m)	Fr	William Mason	Mason, OH

Head coach

- Katie Meier (Duke)

Assistant coach(es)

- Fitzroy Anthony (Palm Beach Atlantic)
- Shenise Johnson (Miami (FL))
- Josh Petersen (Florida State)

Legend

- (C) Team captain
- (S) Suspended
- (I) Ineligible
- (W) Walk-on
- Injured
- Current redshirt

Roster
Last update: October 21, 2022

== Schedule ==
Date time, TV	Rank^{#}	Opponent^{#}	Result	Record	Site (attendance) city, state
Exhibition
November 2, 2022*; 6:00 p.m.		Barry	W 88–28	–	Watsco Center; Coral Gables, FL
Non-conference regular season
November 7, 2022*; 4:00 p.m., ACCNX		Maryland Eastern Shore	W 83–51	1–0	Watsco Center (1,548); Coral Gables, FL
November 10, 2022*; 11:00 a.m., ACCNX		Stetson	W 80–56	2–0	Watsco Center (3,068); Coral Gables, FL
November 13, 2022*; 1:00 p.m., ACCNX		Boston University	W 81–46	3–0	Watsco Center (1,708); Coral Gables, FL
November 16, 2022*; 6:00 p.m., ACCNX		Florida Atlantic	W 75–42	4–0	Watsco Center (1,585); Coral Gables, FL
November 20, 2022*; 5:00 p.m., FloSports		at DePaul	L 83–98	4–1	Wintrust Arena (1,237); Chicago, IL
November 22, 2022*; 7:00 p.m., ESPN+		at Loyola Chicago	W 63–45	5–1	Joseph J. Gentile Arena (391); Chicago, IL
November 25, 2022*; 3:00 p.m., ACCNX		North Carolina A&T; Miami Thanksgiving Tournament	W 97–54	6–1	Watsco Center (1,605); Coral Gables, FL
November 27, 2022*; 2:00 p.m., ACCNX		Columbia; Miami Thanksgiving Tournament	L 71–78	6–2	Watsco Center (1,658); Coral Gables, FL
December 1, 2022*; 9:00 p.m., ACCN		No. 17 Michigan; ACC–Big Ten Women's Challenge	L 64–76	6–3	Watsco Center (1,830); Coral Gables, FL
December 4, 2022*; 2:00 p.m., ACCNX		North Florida	W 85–45	7–3	Watsco Center (1,591); Coral Gables, FL
December 11, 2022*; 4:00 p.m., ACCN		Florida; Rivalry	L 73–76 ^{OT}	7–4	Watsco Center (3,251); Coral Gables, FL
ACC regular season
December 21, 2022; 12:00 p.m., ACCNX		at Florida State; Rivalry	L 85–92	7–5 (0–1)	Donald L. Tucker Center (3,022); Tallahassee, FL
December 29, 2022; 6:00 p.m., ACCN		No. 5 Notre Dame	L 63–66	7–6 (0–2)	Watsco Center (2,153); Coral Gables, FL
January 1, 2023; 2:00 p.m., ACCNX		at Pittsburgh	W 74–67	8–6 (1–2)	Peterson Events Center (636); Pittsburgh, PA
January 5, 2023; 6:00 p.m., ACCNX		No. 22 North Carolina	W 62–58	9–6 (2–2)	Watsco Center (2,044); Coral Gables, FL
January 8, 2023; 1:00 p.m., ACCRSN		No. 9 Virginia Tech	W 77–66	10–6 (3–2)	Watsco Center (1,639); Coral Gables, FL
January 12, 2023; 8:00 p.m., ACCN		at Georgia Tech	W 69–60	11–6 (4–2)	McCamish Pavilion (1,434); Atlanta, GA
January 15, 2023; 2:00 p.m., ACCNX		Wake Forest	W 55–43	12–6 (5–2)	Watsco Center (1,892); Coral Gables, FL
January 19, 2023; 6:00 p.m., ACCN		at No. 20 NC State	L 61–71	12–7 (5–3)	Reynolds Coliseum (5,500); Raleigh, NC
January 26, 2023; 6:00 p.m., ACCRSN		Boston College	W 86–65	13–7 (6–3)	Watsco Center (2,111); Coral Gables, FL
January 29, 2023; 2:00 p.m., ACCNX		at Wake Forest	L 52–55	13–8 (6–4)	LJVM Coliseum (1,225); Winston–Salem, NC
February 2, 2023; 8:00 p.m., ACCRSN		at Clemson	W 69–66 ^{OT}	14–8 (7–4)	Littlejohn Coliseum (1,001); Clemson, SC
February 5, 2023; 12:00 p.m., ACCN		Georgia Tech	W 64–58	15–8 (8–4)	Watsco Center (3,686); Coral Gables, FL
February 9, 2023; 6:00 p.m., ACCRSN		No. 19 Florida State; Rivalry	W 86–82	16–8 (9–4)	Watsco Center; Coral Gables, FL
February 12, 2023; 2:00 p.m., ACCRSN		at No. 9 Duke	L 40–50	16–9 (9–5)	Cameron Indoor Stadium (2,449); Durham, NC
February 16, 2023; 6:00 p.m., ACCNX		Clemson	W 59–54	17–9 (10–5)	Watsco Center (1,923); Coral Gables, FL
February 19, 2023; 1:00 p.m., ACCRSN		at Syracuse	L 68–77	17–10 (10–6)	Carrier Dome (4,566); Syracuse, NY
February 23, 2023; 6:00 p.m., ACCN		at Louisville	L 57–71	17–11 (10–7)	KFC Yum! Center (8,211); Louisville, KY
February 26, 2023; 12:00 p.m., ACCN		Virginia	W 85–74	18–11 (11–7)	Watsco Center (2,453); Coral Gables, FL
ACC Women's Tournament
March 2, 2023; 8:00 p.m., ACCN	(6)	vs. (11) Boston College; Second round	W 84–69	19–11	Greensboro Coliseum (4,578); Greensboro, NC
March 3, 2023; 8:00 p.m., ACCN	(6)	vs. (3) No. 8 Virginia Tech; Quarterfinals	L 42–68	19–12	Greensboro Coliseum (7,823); Greensboro, NC
NCAA Women's Tournament
March 18, 2023*; 2:00 p.m., ESPN	(9 G2)	vs. (8 G2) Oklahoma State; First round	W 62–61	20–12	Simon Skjodt Assembly Hall (13,607); Bloomington, IN
March 20, 2023*; 8:00 p.m., ESPN2	(9 G2)	at (1 G2) No. 2 Indiana; Second round	W 70–68	21–12	Simon Skjodt Assembly Hall (14,480); Bloomington, IN
March 24, 2023*; 2:30 p.m., ESPN	(9 G2)	vs. (4 G2) No. 10т Villanova; Sweet Sixteen	W 70–65	22–12	Bon Secours Wellness Arena; Greenville, SC
March 26, 2023*; 7:00 p.m., ESPN	(9 G2)	vs. (3 G2) No. 9 LSU; Elite Eight	L 42–54	22–13	Bon Secours Wellness Arena (7,988); Greenville, SC
*Non-conference game. ^{#}Rankings from AP Poll. (#) Tournament seedings in parentheses. G2=Greenville 2. All times are in Eastern.

== Rankings ==
Regular season polls
Poll	Pre- Season	Week 2	Week 3	Week 4	Week 5	Week 6	Week 7	Week 8	Week 9	Week 10	Week 11	Week 12	Week 13	Week 14	Week 15	Week 16	Week 17	Week 18	Final
AP	RV	RV			RV					RV	RV								N/A
Coaches	RV	RV								RV	RV								18

Note: The AP does not release a final poll.

Legend
	Increase in ranking
	Decrease in ranking
	Not ranked previous week
(RV)	Received Votes

== See also ==
- 2022–23 Miami Hurricanes men's basketball team
