= 2022–23 Virginia Cavaliers women's basketball team =

Intercollegiate basketball season

2022–23 Virginia Cavaliers women's basketball
- Conference: Atlantic Coast Conference
- Record: 15–15 (4–14 ACC)
- Head coach: Amaka Agugua-Hamilton (1st season)
- Assistant coaches: Alysiah Bond; Tori Jankoska; CJ Jones
- Home arena: John Paul Jones Arena

2022–23 ACC women's basketball standings
	Conf.				Overall
Team	W		L	PCT	W		L	PCT
No. 10т Notre Dame	15	–	3	.833	27	–	6	.818
No. 13 Duke	14	–	4	.778	26	–	7	.788
No. 4 Virginia Tech †	14	–	4	.778	31	–	4	.886
Louisville	12	–	6	.667	26	–	12	.684
Florida State	12	–	6	.667	23	–	10	.697
Miami (FL)	11	–	7	.611	22	–	13	.629
No. 20 North Carolina	11	–	7	.611	22	–	11	.667
NC State	9	–	9	.500	20	–	12	.625
Syracuse	9	–	9	.500	20	–	13	.606
Clemson	7	–	11	.389	19	–	16	.543
Boston College	5	–	13	.278	16	–	17	.485
Wake Forest	5	–	13	.278	17	–	17	.500
Virginia	4	–	14	.222	15	–	15	.500
Georgia Tech	4	–	14	.222	13	–	17	.433
Pittsburgh	3	–	15	.167	10	–	20	.333
† 2023 ACC tournament winner As of March 27, 2023; Rankings from AP poll

The 2022–23 Virginia Cavaliers women's basketball team represented the University of Virginia during the 2022–23 NCAA Division I women's basketball season. The Cavaliers were led by first-year head coach Amaka Agugua-Hamilton, and played their home games at John Paul Jones Arena as members of the Atlantic Coast Conference.

After firing Tina Thompson after the previous season, Virginia announced that Amaka Agugua-Hamilton would be the new head coach of the program.

The Cavaliers finished the season 15–15 and 4–14 in ACC play to finish in a tie for thirteenth place. As the thirteenth seed in the ACC tournament, they lost their first-round matchup with Wake Forest. They were not invited to the NCAA tournament and declined an invitation to the WNIT.

== Previous season ==
The Cavaliers finished the season 5–22 and 2–16 in ACC play to finish in a tie for fourteenth place. As the fourteenth seed in the ACC tournament they lost their First Round matchup with Wake Forest. They were not invited to the NCAA tournament or WNIT. After the season, Virginia announced that Head Coach Tina Thompson had been relieved of her duties after going 30–63 during her tenure.

== Offseason ==
=== Departures ===
Departures
Name	Number	Pos.	Height	Year	Hometown	Reason for departure
Aaliyah Pitts	3	G	6'0"	Sophomore	Suitland, Maryland	Transferred to Western Kentucky
Tihana Stojsavljevic	5	F	6'3"	Graduate Student	Zagreb, Croatia	Graduated
Meg Jefferson	12	F	6'3"	Junior	Sydney, Australia	Transferred to Hawaii
Deja Bristol	13	F	6'1"	Sophomore	Upper Marlboro, Maryland	Transferred to Northeastern
Eleah Parker	21	F	6'4"	Graduate Student	Charlotte, North Carolina	Graduated
Amandine Toi	23	G	5'10"	Graduate Student	Paris, France	Graduated
Nycerra Minnis	32	F	6'3"	Sophomore	Riverdale, Maryland	Transferred to UNC Asheville

=== Incoming transfers ===
Incoming transfers
Name	Number	Pos.	Height	Year	Hometown	Previous school
Mir Mclean	10	G/F	5'11"	Junior	Baltimore, Maryland	UConn
Alexia Smith	23	G	5'8"	Junior	Columbus, Ohio	Minnesota
Sam Brunelle	33	F	6'2"	Graduate Student	Ruckersville, Virginia	Notre Dame

=== Recruiting class ===
College recruiting
Name	Hometown	School	Height	Weight	Commit date
Yonta Vaughn; G	District Heights, Maryland	Bishop McNamara High School	5 ft 8 in (1.73 m)	N/A	
Yonta Vaughn; G	Recruit ratings: ESPN: (92)				
Cady Pauley; G	Milan, Missouri	Milan High School	5 ft 11 in (1.80 m)	N/A	
Cady Pauley; G	Recruit ratings: No ratings found				
Overall recruit ranking:
Note: In many cases, Scout, Rivals, 247Sports, On3, and ESPN may conflict in their listings of height and weight.; In these cases, the average was taken. ESPN grades are on a 100-point scale.; Sources:

== Roster ==
2022–23 Virginia Cavaliers women's basketball team
Players
Coaches

Pos.	#	Name	Height	Year	Previous school	Hometown
G	1	Carole Miller	6 ft 0 in (1.83 m)	Sr	Thomas Edison	Alexandria, VA
G	2	Taylor Valladay	5 ft 7 in (1.7 m)	Sr	Rich South; Marquette	Chicago, IL
G	5	Yonta Vaughn	5 ft 8 in (1.73 m)	Fr	Bishop McNamara	District Heights, MD
G/F	10	Mir Mclean	5 ft 11 in (1.8 m)	Jr	Roland Park; Connecticut	Baltimore, MD
G	14	Kaydan Lawson	6 ft 0 in (1.83 m)	Jr	Orange	Cleveland, OH
G	15	AnnaLiese Griffin	6 ft 1 in (1.85 m)	Fr	Aurora Christian	Joliet, IL
F	20	Camryn Taylor	6 ft 2 in (1.88 m)	Sr	Richwoods; Marquette	Peoria, IL
G	23	Alexia Smith	5 ft 8 in (1.73 m)	So	Columbus Africentric; Minnesota	Columbus, OH
G	32	Cady Pauley	5 ft 11 in (1.8 m)	Fr	Milan	Milan, MO
F	33	Sam Brunelle	6 ft 2 in (1.88 m)	GS	William Monroe; Notre Dame	Ruckersville, VA
F	34	London Clarkson	6 ft 2 in (1.88 m)	Sr	Pflugerville; Florida State	Pflugerville, TX
G	44	McKenna Dale	6 ft 0 in (1.83 m)	GS	Edwin O. Smith; Brown	Storrs, CT

Head coach

- Amaka Agugua-Hamilton (Hofstra)

Assistant coach(es)

- Alysiah Bond (Ohio State)
- Tori Jankoska (Michigan State)
- CJ Jones (Francis Marion)

Legend

- (C) Team captain
- (S) Suspended
- (I) Ineligible
- (W) Walk-on
- Injured
- Current redshirt

Roster
Last update: November 4, 2022

== Schedule ==
Date time, TV	Rank^{#}	Opponent^{#}	Result	Record	Site (attendance) city, state
Exhibition
November 3, 2022*; 7:00 p.m.		Pitt Johnstown	W 92–45	–	John Paul Jones Arena; Charlottesville, VA
Regular season
November 7, 2022*; 5:00 p.m., ACCNX		George Washington	W 85–59	1–0	John Paul Jones Arena (2,503); Charlottesville, VA
November 10, 2022*; 7:00 p.m., ACCNX		UMBC	W 101–46	2–0	John Paul Jones Arena (2,346); Charlottesville, VA
November 13, 2022; 2:00 p.m., ACCN		Wake Forest	W 72–52	3–0 (1–0)	John Paul Jones Arena (2,868); Charlottesville, VA
November 16, 2022*; 7:00 p.m., ESPN+		at Loyola-Chicago	W 68–62	4–0	Gentile Arena (501); Chicago, IL
November 20, 2022*; 2:00 p.m., ESPN+		at American	W 74–60	5–0	Bender Arena (530); Washington, D.C.
November 23, 2022*; 7:00 p.m., ACCNX		Campbell	W 62–41	6–0	John Paul Jones Arena (3,431); Charlottesville, VA
November 26, 2022*; 2:00 p.m., ACCNX		Minnesota; Cavalier Classic	W 73–70	7–0	John Paul Jones Arena (2,871); Charlottesville, VA
November 27, 2022*; 2:00 p.m., ACCN		East Carolina; Cavalier Classic	W 72–50	8–0	John Paul Jones Arena (2,854); Charlottesville, VA
November 30, 2022*; 7:00 p.m., BTN+		at Penn State; ACC–Big Ten Women's Challenge	W 89–68	9–0	Bryce Jordan Center (1,823); University Park, PA
December 4, 2022*; 2:00 p.m., ACCNX		UNC Wilmington	W 78–36	10–0	John Paul Jones Arena (3,221); Charlottesville, VA
December 7, 2022*; 7:00 p.m., FloHoops		at William & Mary	W 83–54	11–0	Kaplan Arena (553); Williamsburg, VA
December 18, 2022*; 2:00 p.m., ACCNX		Morgan State	W 84–28	12–0	John Paul Jones Arena (3,706); Charlottesville, VA
December 21, 2022; 7:00 p.m., ACCNX		at Duke	L 56–70	12–1 (1–1)	Cameron Indoor Stadium (1,568); Durham, NC
December 29, 2022; 7:00 p.m., ACCNX		Georgia Tech	W 69–63	13–1 (2–1)	John Paul Jones Arena (3,749); Charlottesville, VA
January 5, 2023; 7:00 p.m., ACCRSN		at No. 9 Virginia Tech; Rivalry	L 66–74	13–2 (2–2)	Cassell Coliseum (2,630); Blacksburg, VA
January 8, 2023; 3:00 p.m., ACCRSN		at No. 10 NC State	L 62–87	13–3 (2–3)	Reynolds Coliseum (5,500); Raleigh, NC
January 12, 2023; 7:00 p.m., ACCNX		No. 22 North Carolina	L 59–70	13–4 (2–4)	John Paul Jones Arena (3,191); Charlottesville, VA
January 15, 2023; 12:00 p.m., ACCN		Boston College	W 66–50	14–4 (3–4)	John Paul Jones Arena (3,766); Charlottesville, VA
January 19, 2023; 7:00 p.m., ACCNX		Florida State	L 68–77	14–5 (3–5)	John Paul Jones Arena (3,125); Charlottesville, VA
January 22, 2023; 2:00 p.m., ACCN		at No. 7 Notre Dame	L 54–76	14–6 (3–6)	Purcell Pavilion (6,442); Notre Dame, IN
January 26, 2023; 7:00 p.m., ACCNX		at Syracuse	L 72–90	14–7 (3–7)	JMA Wireless Dome (1,606); Syracuse, NY
January 29, 2023; 6:00 p.m., ACCN		No. 12 Virginia Tech; Rivalry	L 60–72	14–8 (3–8)	John Paul Jones Arena (5,103); Charlottesville, VA
February 2, 2023; 8:00 p.m., ACCRSN		at No. 11 North Carolina	L 62–73	14–9 (3–9)	Carmichael Arena (2,490); Chapel Hill, NC
February 5, 2023; 2:00 p.m., ACCN		at Pittsburgh	L 51–60	14–10 (3–10)	Petersen Events Center (1,136); Pittsburgh, PA
February 9, 2023; 7:00 p.m., ACCNX		Louisville	L 53–63	14–11 (3–11)	John Paul Jones Arena (3,008); Charlottesville, VA
February 12, 2023; 12:00 p.m., ACCRSN		No. 22 NC State	W 71–59	15–11 (4–11)	John Paul Jones Arena (3,700); Charlottesville, VA
February 19, 2023; 2:00 p.m., ACCNX		No. 9 Duke	L 52–56	15–12 (4–12)	John Paul Jones Arena (6,378); Charlottesville, VA
February 23, 2023; 7:00 p.m., ACCNX		at Clemson	L 69–79	15–13 (4–13)	Littlejohn Coliseum (892); Clemson, SC
February 26, 2023; 12:00 p.m., ACCN		at Miami (FL)	L 74–85	15–14 (4–14)	Watsco Center (2,453); Coral Gables, FL
ACC Women's Tournament
March 1, 2023; 1:00 p.m., ACCN	(13)	vs. (12) Wake Forest; First round	L 57–68	15–15	Greensboro Coliseum (3,879); Greensboro, NC
*Non-conference game. ^{#}Rankings from AP Poll. (#) Tournament seedings in parentheses. All times are in Eastern.

== Rankings ==
Regular season polls
Poll	Pre- Season	Week 2	Week 3	Week 4	Week 5	Week 6	Week 7	Week 8	Week 9	Week 10	Week 11	Week 12	Week 13	Week 14	Week 15	Week 16	Week 17	Week 18	Final
AP				RV	RV	RV	RV												N/A
Coaches					RV	RV	25	RV	RV										

Note: The AP does not release a final poll.

Legend
	Increase in ranking
	Decrease in ranking
	Not ranked previous week
(RV)	Received Votes

== See also ==
- 2022–23 Virginia Cavaliers men's basketball team
