= 2022–23 Florida State Seminoles women's basketball team =

Intercollegiate basketball season

2022–23 Florida State Seminoles women's basketball

NCAA tournament, First Round
- Conference: Atlantic Coast Conference
- Record: 23–10 (12–6 ACC)
- Head coach: Brooke Wyckoff (2nd season)
- Assistant coaches: Bill Ferrara; Craig Carter; Morgan Toles
- Home arena: Donald L. Tucker Center (Capacity: 12,100)

2022–23 ACC women's basketball standings
	Conf.				Overall
Team	W		L	PCT	W		L	PCT
No. 10т Notre Dame	15	–	3	.833	27	–	6	.818
No. 13 Duke	14	–	4	.778	26	–	7	.788
No. 4 Virginia Tech †	14	–	4	.778	31	–	4	.886
Louisville	12	–	6	.667	26	–	12	.684
Florida State	12	–	6	.667	23	–	10	.697
Miami (FL)	11	–	7	.611	22	–	13	.629
No. 20 North Carolina	11	–	7	.611	22	–	11	.667
NC State	9	–	9	.500	20	–	12	.625
Syracuse	9	–	9	.500	20	–	13	.606
Clemson	7	–	11	.389	19	–	16	.543
Boston College	5	–	13	.278	16	–	17	.485
Wake Forest	5	–	13	.278	17	–	17	.500
Virginia	4	–	14	.222	15	–	15	.500
Georgia Tech	4	–	14	.222	13	–	17	.433
Pittsburgh	3	–	15	.167	10	–	20	.333
† 2023 ACC tournament winner As of March 27, 2023; Rankings from AP poll

The 2022–23 Florida State Seminoles women's basketball team, variously Florida State or FSU, represented Florida State University during the 2022–23 NCAA Division I women's basketball season. They were led by second year head coach Brooke Wyckoff, who previously served as interim head coach for the team during the 2020–21 season. The Seminoles played their home games at the Donald L. Tucker Center on the university's Tallahassee, Florida campus. They competed as members of the Atlantic Coast Conference.

The Seminoles finished the season 23–10 overall and 12–6 in ACC play to finish in a tie for fourth place. As the fifth seed in the ACC Tournament, they earned a bye into the Second round where they were upset by twelfth seed Wake Forest. They received an at-large bid to the NCAA Tournament, marking the tenth consecutive year the team has qualified for the tournament. As the seventh seed in the Seattle 4 Region, they lost to ten seed Georgia to end their season. A contributing factor to their post season losses was the absence of Ta'Niya Latson who lead the team and the ACC in scoring during the regular season and won ACC Freshman of the Year.

== Previous season ==
The Seminoles finished the season 17–14 overall and 10–8 in ACC play to finish in a three-way tie for seventh place. As the ninth seed in the ACC Tournament, they defeated eighth seed Boston College in the Second Round before losing to eventual champions, and first seed NC State in the Quarterfinals. They received an at-large bid to the NCAA Tournament, marking the ninth consecutive year the team has qualified for the tournament. As an eleven seed, the team played a First Four match against Missouri State, which they lost, 60–51, to end their season.

On March 21, 2022, Sue Semrau announced her retirement after 24 seasons as FSU head coach. She was succeeded by Seminoles associate head coach Brooke Wyckoff, who served as the interim head coach for the team during the 2020–21 season during Semrau's leave of absence.

== Off-season ==
=== Departures ===
Departures
Name	Number	Pos.	Height	Year	Hometown	Reason for departure
Bianca Jackson	0	G	5'11"	(redshirt) Senior	Montgomery, Alabama	Graduated
River Baldwin	1	C	6'5"	Junior	Andalusia, Alabama	Transferred to NC State
Sammie Puisis	2	G	6'1"	Junior	Mason, Ohio	Transferred to South Florida
Amaya Brown	3	G	5'11"	(redshirt) Junior	Albuquerque, New Mexico	Transferred to New Mexico
Kourtney Weber	10	G	5'10"	Senior	New Orleans, Louisiana	Graduated
Morgan Jones	24	G	6'2"	Senior	Jonesboro, Georgia	Graduated
Izabela Nicoletti	33	G	5'10"	(redshirt) Junior	Americana, Brazil	Transferred to Fairfield

=== Incoming transfers ===
Incoming transfers
Name	Number	Pos.	Height	Year	Hometown	Previous school
Jazmine Massengill	1	G	6'0"	Graduate Student	Chattanooga, Tennessee	Kentucky
Taylor O'Brien	11	G	5'9"	Graduate Student	Lafayette Hill, Pennsylvania	Bucknell

=== 2022 recruiting class ===
College recruiting information
Name	Hometown	School	Height	Weight	Commit date
Ta'Niya Latson; G	Miami, Florida	American Heritage	5 ft 8 in (1.73 m)	N/A	
Ta'Niya Latson; G	Recruit ratings: ESPN: (97)				
Brianna Turnage; G	Atlanta, Georgia	Westlake	6 ft 1 in (1.85 m)	N/A	
Brianna Turnage; G	Recruit ratings: ESPN: (91)				
Overall recruit ranking:
Note: In many cases, Scout, Rivals, 247Sports, On3, and ESPN may conflict in their listings of height and weight.; In these cases, the average was taken. ESPN grades are on a 100-point scale.; Sources:

== Roster ==
2022–23 Florida State Seminoles women's basketball team
Players
Coaches

Pos.	#	Name	Height	Year	Previous school	Hometown
G	0	Ta'Niya Latson	5 ft 8 in (1.73 m)	Fr	American Heritage	Miami, FL
G	1	Jazmine Massengill	6 ft 0 in (1.83 m)	GS	Hamilton Heights Christian Academy; Kentucky	Chattanooga, TN
G	2	Brianna Turnage	6 ft 1 in (1.85 m)	Fr	Westlake	Atlanta, GA
G	3	O'Mariah Gordon	5 ft 4 in (1.63 m)	So	Braden River	Bradenton, FL
G	4	Sara Bejedi	5 ft 7 in (1.7 m)	Sr	Arizona State	Helsinki, Finland
F	5	Mariana Valenzuela	6 ft 2 in (1.88 m)	So	Montverde Academy	Mazatlán, Mexico
G	11	Taylor O'Brien	5 ft 9 in (1.75 m)	Jr	Plymouth-Whitemarsh; Bucknell	Lafayette Hill, PA
F	21	Makayla Timpson	6 ft 2 in (1.88 m)	So	Early County	Edison, GA
F	23	Erin Howard	6 ft 1 in (1.85 m)	RS Sr	Madison East; Auburn	Madison, WI
F	32	Valencia Myers	6 ft 3 in (1.91 m)	Sr	Solon	Solon, OH

Head coach

- Brooke Wyckoff (Florida State)

Assistant coach(es)

- Bill Ferrara (Florida)
- Craig Carter (Rutgers)
- Morgan Toles (Florida State)

Legend

- (C) Team captain
- (S) Suspended
- (I) Ineligible
- (W) Walk-on
- Injured
- Current redshirt

Roster
Last update: October 11, 2022

== Schedule and results ==
Date time, TV	Rank^{#}	Opponent^{#}	Result	Record	Site (attendance) city, state
Exhibition
October 30, 2022*; 2:00 p.m.		West Georgia	W 115–46	–	Donald L. Tucker Center; Tallahassee, FL
November 3, 2022*; 6:00 p.m.		Flagler	W 119–27	–	Donald L. Tucker Center; Tallahassee, FL
Non-conference regular season
November 7, 2022*; 11:00 a.m., ACCNX		Bethune–Cookman; Education Game	W 113–50	1–0	Donald L. Tucker Center (3,597); Tallahassee, FL
November 10, 2022*; 7:00 p.m., ESPN+		at Kent State	W 80–71	2–0	MAC Center (2,209); Kent, OH
November 13, 2022*; 2:00 p.m., ACCNX		Georgia State	W 75–70	3–0	Donald L. Tucker Center (1,591); Tallahassee, FL
November 16, 2022*; 6:00 p.m., ACCNX		Florida; Rivalry	W 92–77	4–0	Donald L. Tucker Center (2,505); Tallahassee, FL
November 19, 2022*; 5:00 p.m., ESPN+		at Houston	W 79–73 ^{OT}	5–0	Fertitta Center (1,036); Houston, TX
November 24, 2022*; 11:00 a.m., FloHoops		vs. Oklahoma State; Cancún Challenge	L 77–79	5–1	Hard Rock Hotel Riviera Maya (107); Cancún, Mexico
November 25, 2022*; 1:30 p.m., FloHoops		vs. Purdue; Cancún Challenge	W 76–75	6–1	Hard Rock Hotel Riviera Maya (248); Cancún, Mexico
November 26, 2022*; 11:00 a.m., FloHoops		vs. Harvard; Cancún Challenge	W 88–57	7–1	Hard Rock Hotel Riviera Maya (107); Cancún, Mexico
December 1, 2022*; 7:30 p.m., BTN+		at Wisconsin; ACC–Big Ten Women's Challenge	W 92–87	8–1	Kohl Center (3,035); Madison, WI
December 4, 2022*; 2:00 p.m., ACCNX		Stetson	W 83–48	9–1	Donald L. Tucker Center (1,967); Tallahassee, FL
December 11, 2022*; 2:00 p.m., ACCNX		Texas Southern	W 108–51	10–1	Donald L. Tucker Center (2,167); Tallahassee, FL
December 15, 2022*; 6:00 p.m., ACCN		Presbyterian	W 98–37	11–1	Donald L. Tucker Center (1,910); Tallahassee, FL
December 18, 2022*; 1:00 p.m., ESPN		vs. No. 9 Connecticut; Basketball Hall of Fame Women's Showcase	L 77–85	11–2	Mohegan Sun Arena; Uncasville, CT
ACC regular season
December 21, 2022; 12:00 p.m., ACCNX		Miami (FL); Rivalry	W 92–85	12–2 (1–0)	Donald L. Tucker Center (3,022); Tallahassee, FL
December 29, 2022; 8:00 p.m., ACCRSN		at No. 13 North Carolina	W 78–71	13–2 (2–0)	Carmichael Arena (2,237); Chapel Hill, NC
January 1, 2023; 2:00 p.m., ACCNX		at Georgia Tech	W 99–58	14–2 (3–0)	McCamish Pavilion (1,731); Atlanta, GA
January 5, 2023; 6:00 p.m., ACCNX		Clemson	W 93–62	15–2 (4–0)	Donald L. Tucker Center (2,009); Tallahassee, FL
January 8, 2023; 12:00 p.m., ACCN		at Boston College	L 71–77 ^{OT}	15–3 (4–1)	Conte Forum (957); Chestnut Hill, MA
January 12, 2023; 6:00 p.m., ACCN		No. 11 NC State	W 91–72	16–3 (5–1)	Donald L. Tucker Center (2,014); Tallahassee, FL
January 15, 2023; 1:00 p.m., ACCRSN		Louisville	L 75–82	16–4 (5–2)	Donald L. Tucker Center (2,544); Tallahassee, FL
January 19, 2023; 7:00 p.m., ACCNX		at Virginia	W 77–68	17–4 (6–2)	John Paul Jones Arena (3,125); Charlottesville, VA
January 22, 2023; 2:00 p.m., ACCNX		Pittsburgh	W 74–37	18–4 (7–2)	Donald L. Tucker Center (2,025); Tallahassee, FL
January 26, 2023; 8:00 p.m., ACCRSN	No. 24	at No. 7 Notre Dame	L 47–70	18–5 (7–3)	Purcell Pavilion (4,956); Notre Dame, IN
January 29, 2023; 2:00 p.m., ACCN	No. 24	No. 16 Duke	W 70–57	19–5 (8–3)	Donald L. Tucker Center (2,904); Tallahassee, FL
February 2, 2023; 6:00 p.m., ACCNX	No. 23	Wake Forest	W 72–44	20–5 (9–3)	Donald L. Tucker Center (2,042); Tallahassee, FL
February 9, 2023; 6:00 p.m., ACCRSN	No. 19	at Miami (FL); Rivalry	L 82–86	20–6 (9–4)	Watsco Center; Coral Gables, FL
February 12, 2023; 2:00 p.m., ACCN	No. 19	at No. 11 Virginia Tech	L 70–84	20–7 (9–5)	Cassell Coliseum (2,897); Blacksburg, VA
February 16, 2023; 6:00 p.m., ACCN	No. 24	Syracuse	W 78–65	21–7 (10–5)	Donald L. Tucker Center (2,794); Tallahassee, FL
February 19, 2023; 2:00 p.m., ACCN	No. 24	Georgia Tech	W 80–66	22–7 (11–5)	Donald L. Tucker Center (2,990); Tallahassee, FL
February 23, 2023; 6:00 p.m., ACCNX	No. 23	at Wake Forest	W 61–60	23–7 (12–5)	LJVM Coliseum (680); Winston–Salem, NC
February 26, 2023; 2:00 p.m., ACCN	No. 23	at Clemson	L 61–74	23–8 (12–6)	Littlejohn Coliseum (1,842); Clemson, SC
ACC Women's Tournament
March 2, 2023; 11:00 a.m., ACCN	(5)	vs. (12) Wake Forest; Second round	L 54–65	23–9	Greensboro Coliseum (4,177); Greensboro, NC
NCAA Women's Tournament
March 17, 2023; 1:30 p.m., ESPN2	(7 S4)	vs. (10 S4) Georgia; First round	L 54–66	23–10	Carver–Hawkeye Arena (14,382); Iowa City, IA
*Non-conference game. ^{#}Rankings from AP Poll. (#) Tournament seedings in parentheses. S4=Seattle 4. All times are in Eastern Time.

== Rankings ==
Ranking movements Legend: ██ Increase in ranking ██ Decrease in ranking — = Not ranked RV = Received votes
	Week																			
Poll	Pre	1	2	3	4	5	6	7	8	9	10	11	12	13	14	15	16	17	18	Final
AP	—	—	—	—	RV	RV	—	—	RV	RV	RV	24	23	19	24	23	RV	RV	RV	Not released
Coaches	—	—	—	—	RV	RV	—	—	RV	RV	RV	RV	RV	24	RV	RV	RV	—	—	—

Note: The AP does not release a final poll.

== Awards ==
=== Watchlists ===
Award	Player
Wooden Award	Ta’Niya Latson

=== Honors ===
Honors
Player	Award	Ref.
Ta’Niya Latson	ACC Player of the Week (Week One); ACC Rookie of the Week (Week One); ACC Player of the Week (Week Two); ACC Rookie of the Week (Week Two); ACC Rookie of the Week (Week Three); ACC Rookie of the Week (Week Four); ACC Rookie of the Week (Week Five); USBWA National Freshman Player of the Week (Week Five); ACC Rookie of the Week (Week Six); ACC Rookie of the Week (Week Seven); ACC Player of the Week (Week Eight); ACC Rookie of the Week (Week Eight); ACC Rookie of the Week (Week Ten); Naismith Women’s Player of the Year Midseason Team; ACC Rookie of the Week (Week Fifteen); All-ACC First Team; All-ACC Freshman Team; ACC Rookie of the Year; Ann Meyers Drysdale Award finalist John R. Wooden Award finalist National Freshman of the Year; USBWA Honorable Mention All-American; Associated Press Honorable Mention All-American; Tamika Catchings Award (U.S. Basketball Writers Association’s National Freshman Player of the Year); WBCA NCAA Division I Freshman of the Year; WBCA Honorable Mention All-American	
Makayla Timpson	All-ACC Second Team; All-ACC Defensive Team; ACC Most Improved Player	
