= 2022–23 Pittsburgh Panthers women's basketball team =

Intercollegiate basketball season

2022–23 Pittsburgh Panthers women's basketball
- Conference: Atlantic Coast Conference
- Record: 10–20 (3–15 ACC)
- Head coach: Lance White (5th season)
- Assistant coaches: Terri Mitchell; Nick DiPillo; Brianna Kiesel
- Home arena: Petersen Events Center

2022–23 ACC women's basketball standings
	Conf.				Overall
Team	W		L	PCT	W		L	PCT
No. 10т Notre Dame	15	–	3	.833	27	–	6	.818
No. 13 Duke	14	–	4	.778	26	–	7	.788
No. 4 Virginia Tech †	14	–	4	.778	31	–	4	.886
Louisville	12	–	6	.667	26	–	12	.684
Florida State	12	–	6	.667	23	–	10	.697
Miami (FL)	11	–	7	.611	22	–	13	.629
No. 20 North Carolina	11	–	7	.611	22	–	11	.667
NC State	9	–	9	.500	20	–	12	.625
Syracuse	9	–	9	.500	20	–	13	.606
Clemson	7	–	11	.389	19	–	16	.543
Boston College	5	–	13	.278	16	–	17	.485
Wake Forest	5	–	13	.278	17	–	17	.500
Virginia	4	–	14	.222	15	–	15	.500
Georgia Tech	4	–	14	.222	13	–	17	.433
Pittsburgh	3	–	15	.167	10	–	20	.333
† 2023 ACC tournament winner As of March 27, 2023; Rankings from AP poll

The 2022–23 Pittsburgh Panthers women's basketball team represented The University of Pittsburgh during the 2022–23 NCAA Division I women's basketball season. The Panthers were led by fifth-year head coach Lance White, and played their home games at the Petersen Events Center as members of the Atlantic Coast Conference.

The Panthers finished the season 10–20 overall and 3–15 in ACC play to finish in fifteenth place. As the fifteenth seed in the ACC tournament, they lost their first round matchup with Clemson. They were not invited to the NCAA tournament or the WNIT. After the season, Head Coach Lance White was fired.

== Previous season ==
The Panthers finished the season 11–19 overall and 2–16 in ACC play to finish in a tie for fourteenth place. As the fifteenth seed in the ACC tournament, they lost their first round matchup with Duke. They were not invited to the NCAA tournament or the WNIT.

== Off-season ==
=== Departures ===
Departures
Name	Number	Pos.	Height	Year	Hometown	Reason for departure
Ismini Prapa	10	G	5'7"	Senior	Athens, Greece	Graduated
Tracey Hueston	13	F	6'2"	Sophomore	Roanoke, Virginia	Transferred to Charlotte
Mary Dunn	15	F	6'3"	Graduate student	Washington, Pennsylvania	Graduated
Jayla Everett	20	G	5'10"	Senior	St Louis, Missouri	Dismissed from team
Rita Igbokwe	23	C	6'4"	Junior	Flint, Michigan	Transferred to Ole Miss

=== Incoming transfers ===
Incoming transfers
Name	Number	Pos.	Height	Year	Hometown	Previous school
Channise Lewis	10	G	5'8"	Graduate student	Miami, Florida	Maryland
Gabby Hutcherson	22	F	6'2"	Junior	Westerville, Ohio	Ohio State

=== Recruiting class ===
College recruiting
Name	Hometown	School	Height	Weight	Commit date
Aislin Malcolm; G	Carnegie, Pennsylvania	Chartiers Valley	5 ft 10 in (1.78 m)	N/A	
Aislin Malcolm; G	Recruit ratings: ESPN: (91)				
Marley Washenitz; G	Fairmont, West Virginia	Fairmont	5 ft 7 in (1.70 m)	N/A	
Marley Washenitz; G	Recruit ratings: No ratings found				
Avery Strickland; G	Knoxville, Tennessee	Farragut	5 ft 10 in (1.78 m)	N/A	
Avery Strickland; G	Recruit ratings: No ratings found				
Overall recruit ranking:
Note: In many cases, Scout, Rivals, 247Sports, On3, and ESPN may conflict in their listings of height and weight.; In these cases, the average was taken. ESPN grades are on a 100-point scale.; Sources:

== Roster ==
2022–23 Pittsburgh Panthers women's basketball team
Players
Coaches

Pos.	#	Name	Height	Year	Previous school	Hometown
G	0	Sandrine Clesca	5 ft 9 in (1.75 m)	Jr	Winston-Salem Christian School	Laval, Quebec
G	1	Dayshanette Harris	5 ft 7 in (1.7 m)	Sr	Ursuline	Youngstown, OH
G	2	Liatu King	6 ft 0 in (1.83 m)	Jr	Bishop McNamara	Washington, D.C.
G	3	Taisha Exanor	6 ft 0 in (1.83 m)	Jr	Dawson College	Châteauguay, Quebec
G	4	Emy Hayford	5 ft 8 in (1.73 m)	Sr	Caland Lyceum	Maastricht, Netherlands
G	5	Amber Brown	6 ft 0 in (1.83 m)	Sr	Little Rock Christian Academy	Monroe, LA
G	10	Channise Lewis	5 ft 8 in (1.73 m)	GS	Miami Country Day; Maryland	Miami, Florida
G	11	Marley Washenitz	5 ft 7 in (1.7 m)	Fr	Fairmont	Fairmont, WV
G	12	Aislin Malcolm	5 ft 10 in (1.78 m)	Fr	Chartiers Valley	Carnegie, PA
G	13	Destiny Strother	5 ft 9 in (1.75 m)	Sr	Carman-Ainsworth; Marquette	Flint, MI
F	14	Cynthia Ezeja	6 ft 3 in (1.91 m)	RS Jr	20th High School of Athens	Athens, Greece
F	21	Maliyah Johnson	6 ft 0 in (1.83 m)	So	Africentric Early College	Columbus, OH
F	22	Gabby Hutcherson	6 ft 2 in (1.88 m)	Jr	Westerville South; Ohio State	Westerville, OH
G	23	Avery Strickland	5 ft 10 in (1.78 m)	Fr	Farragut	Knoxville, TN

Head coach

- Lance White (Texas Tech)

Assistant coach(es)

- Terri Mitchell (Duquesne)
- Nick DiPillo (Fairleigh Dickinson)
- Brianna Kiesel (Pittsburgh)

Legend

- (C) Team captain
- (S) Suspended
- (I) Ineligible
- (W) Walk-on
- Injured
- Current redshirt

Roster
Last update: October 31, 2022

== Schedule ==
Date time, TV	Rank^{#}	Opponent^{#}	Result	Record	Site (attendance) city, state
Regular season
November 7, 2022*; 7:00 p.m.		at Coppin State	W 56–41	1–0	Physical Education Complex (516); Baltimore, MD
November 12, 2022*; 6:00 p.m., ACCNX		George Mason	W 63–45	2–0	Peterson Events Center (437); Pittsburgh, PA
November 16, 2022*; 11:00 a.m., ACCNX		Bryant	W 93–54	3–0	Peterson Events Center (3,154); Pittsburgh, PA
November 19, 2022*; 6:00 p.m., ACCNX		Duquesne; City Game	W 61–45	4–0	Peterson Events Center (1,513); Pittsburgh, PA
November 25, 2022*; 2:00 p.m.		vs. Towson; Fort Myers Tip-Off	W 72–62	5–0	Suncoast Credit Union Arena (315); Fort Myers, FL
November 26, 2022*; 2:00 p.m.		vs. DePaul; Fort Myers Tip-Off	L 59–74	5–1	Suncoast Credit Union Arena (440); Fort Myers, FL
November 27, 2022*; 11:30 a.m.		vs. No. 14 Maryland; Fort Myers Tip-Off	L 63–87	5–2	Suncoast Credit Union Arena (323); Fort Myers, FL
November 30, 2022*; 5:00 p.m., ACCN		Illinois; ACC–Big Ten Women's Challenge	L 71–92	5–3	Peterson Events Center (274); Pittsburgh, PA
December 7, 2022*; 6:00 p.m., ACCNX		Loyola (MD)	W 78–42	6–3	Peterson Events Center (264); Pittsburgh, PA
December 11, 2022*; 12:00 p.m., ACCN		Ball State	L 66–68 ^{OT}	6–4	Peterson Events Center (523); Pittsburgh, PA
December 18, 2022; 2:00 p.m., ACCN		Louisville	L 53–77	6–5 (0–1)	Peterson Events Center (491); Pittsburgh, PA
December 21, 2022*; 12:00 p.m., ACCNX		North Alabama	W 85–83	7–5	Peterson Events Center (529); Pittsburgh, PA
December 29, 2022; 6:00 p.m., ACCNX		at Wake Forest	L 51–66	7–6 (0–2)	LJVM Coliseum (858); Winston-Salem, NC
January 1, 2023; 2:00 p.m., ACCNX		Miami (FL)	L 67–74	7–7 (0–3)	Peterson Events Center (636); Pittsburgh, PA
January 5, 2023; 6:00 p.m., ACCN		at Syracuse	L 71–89	7–8 (0–4)	Carrier Dome (1,956); Syracuse, NY
January 8, 2023; 2:00 p.m., ACCN		at Louisville	L 69–76	7–9 (0–5)	KFC Yum! Center (9,218); Louisville, KY
January 15, 2023; 2:00 p.m., ACCNX		Clemson	L 57–72	7–10 (0–6)	Peterson Events Center (953); Pittsburgh, PA
January 19, 2023; 6:00 p.m., ACCNX		No. 12 Virginia Tech	L 62–69	7–11 (0–7)	Peterson Events Center (352); Pittsburgh, PA
January 22, 2023; 2:00 p.m., ACCNX		at Florida State	L 37–74	7–12 (0–8)	Donald L. Tucker Center (2,025); Tallahassee, FL
January 26, 2023; 6:00 p.m., ACCNX		No. 15 North Carolina	L 57–72	7–13 (0–9)	Peterson Events Center (571); Pittsburgh, PA
January 29, 2023; 2:00 p.m., ACCNX		at Boston College	L 60–74	7–14 (0–10)	Conte Forum (1,604); Chestnut Hill, MA
February 2, 2023; 6:00 p.m., ACCN		at No. 16 Duke	L 44–53	7–15 (0–11)	Cameron Indoor Stadium (1,741); Durham, NC
February 5, 2023; 2:00 p.m., ACCN		Virginia	W 60–51	8–15 (1–11)	Peterson Events Center (1,136); Pittsburgh, PA
February 9, 2023; 6:00 p.m., ACCN		at No. 10 Notre Dame	L 63–69	8–16 (1–12)	Purcell Pavilion (4,716); Notre Dame, IN
February 12, 2023; 2:00 p.m., ACCNX		at Georgia Tech	W 85–79	9–16 (2–12)	McCamish Pavilion (1,661); Atlanta, GA
February 16, 2023; 6:00 p.m., ACCNX		Boston College	W 75–64	10–16 (3–12)	Peterson Events Center (475); Pittsburgh, PA
February 19, 2023; 2:00 p.m., ACCNX		No. 10 Notre Dame	L 43–83	10–17 (3–13)	Peterson Events Center (2,829); Pittsburgh, PA
February 23, 2023; 6:00 p.m., ACCNX		Syracuse	L 55–85	10–18 (3–14)	Peterson Events Center (517); Pittsburgh, PA
February 26, 2023; 2:00 p.m., ACCNX		at NC State	L 63–68	10–19 (3–15)	Reynolds Coliseum (5,500); Raleigh, NC
ACC Women's tournament
March 1, 2023; 3:30 p.m., ACCN	(15)	vs. (10) Clemson; First round	L 53–71	10–20	Greensboro Coliseum (3,879); Greensboro, NC
*Non-conference game. ^{#}Rankings from AP Poll. (#) Tournament seedings in parentheses. All times are in Eastern.

== Rankings ==
Regular season polls
Poll	Pre- season	Week 2	Week 3	Week 4	Week 5	Week 6	Week 7	Week 8	Week 9	Week 10	Week 11	Week 12	Week 13	Week 14	Week 15	Week 16	Week 17	Week 18	Final
AP																			N/A
Coaches																			

Note: The AP does not release a final poll.

Legend
	Increase in ranking
	Decrease in ranking
	Not ranked in previous week
(RV)	Received votes
(NR)	Not ranked
