= 2022–23 Boston College Eagles women's basketball team =

Intercollegiate basketball season

2022–23 Boston College Eagles women's basketball
- Conference: Atlantic Coast Conference
- Record: 16–17 (5–13 ACC)
- Head coach: Joanna Bernabei-McNamee (5th season)
- Assistant coaches: Sean Ehlbeck; Chris Meadows Sr.
- Home arena: Conte Forum

2022–23 ACC women's basketball standings
	Conf.				Overall
Team	W		L	PCT	W		L	PCT
No. 10т Notre Dame	15	–	3	.833	27	–	6	.818
No. 13 Duke	14	–	4	.778	26	–	7	.788
No. 4 Virginia Tech †	14	–	4	.778	31	–	4	.886
Louisville	12	–	6	.667	26	–	12	.684
Florida State	12	–	6	.667	23	–	10	.697
Miami (FL)	11	–	7	.611	22	–	13	.629
No. 20 North Carolina	11	–	7	.611	22	–	11	.667
NC State	9	–	9	.500	20	–	12	.625
Syracuse	9	–	9	.500	20	–	13	.606
Clemson	7	–	11	.389	19	–	16	.543
Boston College	5	–	13	.278	16	–	17	.485
Wake Forest	5	–	13	.278	17	–	17	.500
Virginia	4	–	14	.222	15	–	15	.500
Georgia Tech	4	–	14	.222	13	–	17	.433
Pittsburgh	3	–	15	.167	10	–	20	.333
† 2023 ACC tournament winner As of March 27, 2023; Rankings from AP poll

The 2022–23 Boston College Eagles women's basketball team represented Boston College during the 2022–23 NCAA Division I women's basketball season. The Eagles were led by fifth-year head coach Joanna Bernabei-McNamee. They played their home games at the Conte Forum in Chestnut Hill, Massachusetts and were members of the Atlantic Coast Conference (ACC).

The Eagles finished the season 16–17 overall and 5–13 in ACC play, to finish in a tie for eleventh place. As the eleventh seed in the ACC tournament, they defeated Georgia Tech in the first round before losing to Miami in the second round. They were not invited to the NCAA tournament or WNIT.

== Previous season ==
The Eagles finished the 2021–22 season 21–12 overall and 10–8 in ACC play, to finish in a three-way tie for seventh place. As the eighth seed in the ACC tournament, they lost to Florida State in the first round. They received an automatic bid to the WNIT where they defeated Maine in the first round and Quinnipiac in the second round before losing to Columbia in the third round to end their season.

== Off-season ==
=== Departures ===
Departures
Name	Number	Pos.	Height	Year	Hometown	Reason for departure
Cameron Swartz	1	G	5' 11"	Senior	Marietta, GA	Graduated
Jaelyn Batts	3	G/F	6' 0"	Junior	South Riding, VA	Transferred to Northeastern
Makayla Dickens	10	G	5' 8"	Senior	Virginia Beach, VA	Graduated
Amaria Fields	11	G	5' 11"	Freshman	McKinney, TX	—
Taylor Soule	13	F	5' 11"	Senior	West Lebanon, NH	Graduated
Marnelle Garraud	14	G	5' 7"	Senior	Lynn, MA	Graduated
Allie Palmieri	24	G	5' 10"	Freshman	Trumbull, CT	Transferred to Seton Hall
Clara Ford	32	C	6' 3"	Senior	Vienna, VA	Graduated

=== Recruiting class ===
College recruiting information
Name	Hometown	School	Height	Weight	Commit date
Ally Carman; F	Barnegat, NJ	Red Bank	6 ft 5 in (1.96 m)	N/A	
Ally Carman; F	Recruit ratings: ESPN: (91)				
T'Yana Todd; G	Vaughan, ON	IMG Academy	6 ft 0 in (1.83 m)	N/A	
T'Yana Todd; G	Recruit ratings: No ratings found				
Taina Mair; G	Boston, MA	Brooks School	5 ft 9 in (1.75 m)	N/A	
Taina Mair; G	Recruit ratings: No ratings found				
Kayla Lezama; G	Boston, MA	Noble and Greenough School	5 ft 11 in (1.80 m)	N/A	
Kayla Lezama; G	Recruit ratings: No ratings found				
Ava McGee; G	Washington, D.C.	Maret	5 ft 10 in (1.78 m)	N/A	
Ava McGee; G	Recruit ratings: No ratings found				
Overall recruit ranking:
Note: In many cases, Scout, Rivals, 247Sports, On3, and ESPN may conflict in their listings of height and weight.; In these cases, the average was taken. ESPN grades are on a 100-point scale.; Sources:

== Roster ==
2022–23 Boston College Eagles women's basketball team
Players
Coaches

Pos.	#	Name	Height	Year	Previous school	Hometown
G	2	Kaylah Ivey	5 ft 8 in (1.73 m)	Jr	Riverdale Baptist School	Forestville, MD
G	3	Ava McGee	5 ft 10 in (1.78 m)	Fr	Maret	Washington, D.C.
G/F	4	JoJo Lacey	6 ft 1 in (1.85 m)	Jr	Westtown School	Douglassville, PA
F/C	5	Maria Gakdeng	6 ft 3 in (1.91 m)	So	New Hope Academy	Lanham, MD
F	12	Ally Van Timmeren	6 ft 2 in (1.88 m)	So	Jenison	Allendale, MI
G	14	Kayla Lezama	5 ft 11 in (1.8 m)	Fr	Noble and Greenough School	Boston, MA
G	20	Taina Mair	5 ft 9 in (1.75 m)	Fr	Brooks School	Boston, MA
G	21	Andrea Daley	6 ft 0 in (1.83 m)	So	Miami Country Day	Miami, FL
G	24	Dontavia Waggoner	6 ft 0 in (1.83 m)	So	The Ensworth School	Nashville, TN
G	30	T'Yana Todd	6 ft 0 in (1.83 m)	Fr	IMG Academy	Vaughan, ON
C	43	Ally Carman	6 ft 5 in (1.96 m)	Fr	Red Bank	Barnegat, NJ
C	44	Akunna Konkwo	6 ft 2 in (1.88 m)	RS So	Bishop Ireton	Alexandria, VA

Head coach

- Joanna Bernabei-McNamee (West Liberty)

Assistant coach(es)

- Sean Ehlbeck (Maryland)
- Chris Meadows Sr. (St. Bonaventure)

Legend

- (C) Team captain
- (S) Suspended
- (I) Ineligible
- (W) Walk-on
- Injured
- Current redshirt

Roster
Last update: October 6, 2022

== Schedule ==
Date time, TV	Rank^{#}	Opponent^{#}	Result	Record	Site (attendance) city, state
Regular season
November 7, 2022*; 5:00 p.m., ACCNX		UMass Lowell	W 81–53	1–0	Conte Forum (571); Chestnut Hill, MA
November 10, 2022*; 7:00 p.m., ESPN+		at Harvard	L 59–69	1–1	Lavietes Pavilion (641); Boston, MA
November 13, 2022*; 4:00 p.m., ACCN		No. 14 Ohio State	L 64–82	1–2	Conte Forum (1,022); Chestnut Hill, MA
November 16, 2022*; 11:00 a.m., NESN/FloHoops		at Northeastern	W 64–59	2–2	Matthews Arena (1,028); Boston, MA
November 20, 2022*; 12:00 p.m., ACCNX		Providence	W 73–64	3–2	Conte Forum (842); Chestnut Hill, MA
November 23, 2022*; 12:00 p.m., ACCNX		Holy Cross	W 52–42	4–2	Conte Forum (604); Chestnut Hill, MA
November 25, 2022*; 5:00 p.m., FloHoops		vs. Morgan State; Puerto Rico Classic	W 75–34	5–2	Roberto Clemente Coliseum (100); San Juan, PR
November 26, 2022*; 5:00 p.m., FloHoops		vs. Stephen F. Austin; Puerto Rico Classic	L 53–67	5–3	Roberto Clemente Coliseum (100); San Juan, PR
November 30, 2022*; 7:00 p.m., ACCRSN		Rutgers; ACC–Big Ten Women's Challenge	W 75–61	6–3	Conte Forum (465); Chestnut Hill, MA
December 4, 2022*; 2:00 p.m., ACCNX		Boston University	W 90–80	7–3	Conte Forum (608); Chestnut Hill, MA
December 7, 2022; 6:00 p.m., ACCN		No. 7 Virginia Tech	L 58–73	7–4 (0–1)	Conte Forum (1,112); Chestnut Hill, MA
December 10, 2022*; 2:00 p.m., ACCNX		Albany	W 74–62	8–4	Conte Forum (674); Chestnut Hill, MA
December 13, 2022*; 11:00 a.m., ACCNX		Eastern Kentucky	W 76–65	9–4	Conte Forum (1,461); Chestnut Hill, MA
December 18, 2022; 1:00 p.m., ACCRSN		Georgia Tech	W 74–62	10–4 (1–1)	Conte Forum (707); Chestnut Hill, MA
December 22, 2022*; 12:00 p.m., ACCNX		Central Connecticut State	W 86–35	11–4	Conte Forum (583); Chestnut Hill, MA
January 1, 2023; 12:00 p.m., ACCN		at No. 5 Notre Dame	L 48–85	11–5 (1–2)	Purcell Pavilion (5,532); Notre Dame, IN
January 5, 2023; 7:00 p.m., ACCNX		at No. 10 NC State	W 79–71	12–5 (2–2)	Reynolds Coliseum (5,145); Raleigh, NC
January 8, 2023; 12:00 p.m., ACCN		Florida State	W 77–71 ^{OT}	13–5 (3–2)	Conte Forum (957); Chestnut Hill, MA
January 12, 2023; 7:00 p.m., ACCNX		Syracuse	L 73–83	13–6 (3–3)	Conte Forum (964); Chestnut Hill, MA
January 15, 2023; 12:00 p.m., ACCNX		at Virginia	L 50–66	13–7 (3–4)	John Paul Jones Arena (3,766); Charlottesville, VA
January 19, 2023; 7:00 p.m., ACCNX		at Louisville	L 65–73	13–8 (3–5)	KFC Yum! Center (7,592); Louisville, KY
January 22, 2023; 2:00 p.m., ACCNX		Clemson	L 57–67	13–9 (3–6)	Conte Forum (1,403); Chestnut Hill, MA
January 26, 2023; 6:00 p.m., ACCRSN		at Miami (FL)	L 65–86	13–10 (3–7)	Watsco Center (2,111); Coral Gables, FL
January 29, 2023; 2:00 p.m., ACCNX		Pittsburgh	W 74–60	14–10 (4–7)	Conte Forum (1,604); Chestnut Hill, MA
February 2, 2023; 7:00 p.m., ACCNX		No. 9 Notre Dame	L 59–72	14–11 (4–8)	Conte Forum (1,378); Chestnut Hill, MA
February 5, 2023; 2:00 p.m., ACCNX		at Syracuse	L 72–79	14–12 (4–9)	Carrier Dome (2,723); Syracuse, NY
February 9, 2023; 7:00 p.m., ACCNX		No. 9 Duke	L 27–68	14–13 (4–10)	Conte Forum (2,347); Chestnut Hill, MA
February 12, 2023; 12:00 p.m., ACCN		at No. 14 North Carolina	L 55–73	14–14 (4–11)	Carmichael Arena (2,841); Chapel Hill, NC
February 16, 2023; 6:00 p.m., ACCNX		at Pittsburgh	L 64–75	14–15 (4–12)	Peterson Events Center (475); Pittsburgh, PA
February 19, 2023; 12:00 p.m., ACCN		Louisville	L 52–62	14–16 (4–13)	Conte Forum (1,423); Chestnut Hill, MA
February 26, 2023; 2:00 p.m., ACCNX		at Wake Forest	W 73–63	15–16 (5–13)	LJVM Coliseum (1,077); Winston-Salem, NC
ACC women's tournament
March 1, 2023; 6:30 p.m., ACCN	(11)	vs. (14) Georgia Tech; First round	W 62–57	16–16	Greensboro Coliseum (3,879); Greensboro, NC
March 2, 2023; 8:00 p.m., ACCN	(11)	vs. (6) Miami (FL); Second round	L 69–84	16–17	Greensboro Coliseum (4,578); Greensboro, NC
*Non-conference game. ^{#}Rankings from AP poll. (#) Tournament seedings in parentheses. All times are in Eastern.

== Rankings ==
Regular-season polls
Poll	Pre- season	Week 2	Week 3	Week 4	Week 5	Week 6	Week 7	Week 8	Week 9	Week 10	Week 11	Week 12	Week 13	Week 14	Week 15	Week 16	Week 17	Week 18	Final
AP																			N/A
Coaches																			

Note: The AP does not release a final poll.

Legend
	Increase in ranking
	Decrease in ranking
	Not ranked in previous week
(RV)	Received votes
(NR)	Not ranked

== See also ==
- 2022–23 Boston College Eagles men's basketball team
