= 2022–23 Syracuse Orange women's basketball team =

Intercollegiate basketball season

2022–23 Syracuse Orange women's basketball

WNIT, Super 16
- Conference: Atlantic Coast Conference
- Record: 20–13 (9–9 ACC)
- Head coach: Felisha Legette-Jack (1st season)
- Assistant coaches: Sue Ludwig; Khyreed Carter; Kristen Sharkey
- Home arena: JMA Wireless Dome

2022–23 ACC women's basketball standings
	Conf.				Overall
Team	W		L	PCT	W		L	PCT
No. 10т Notre Dame	15	–	3	.833	27	–	6	.818
No. 13 Duke	14	–	4	.778	26	–	7	.788
No. 4 Virginia Tech †	14	–	4	.778	31	–	4	.886
Louisville	12	–	6	.667	26	–	12	.684
Florida State	12	–	6	.667	23	–	10	.697
Miami (FL)	11	–	7	.611	22	–	13	.629
No. 20 North Carolina	11	–	7	.611	22	–	11	.667
NC State	9	–	9	.500	20	–	12	.625
Syracuse	9	–	9	.500	20	–	13	.606
Clemson	7	–	11	.389	19	–	16	.543
Boston College	5	–	13	.278	16	–	17	.485
Wake Forest	5	–	13	.278	17	–	17	.500
Virginia	4	–	14	.222	15	–	15	.500
Georgia Tech	4	–	14	.222	13	–	17	.433
Pittsburgh	3	–	15	.167	10	–	20	.333
† 2023 ACC tournament winner As of March 27, 2023; Rankings from AP poll

The 2022–23 Syracuse Orange women's basketball team represented Syracuse University during the 2022–23 NCAA Division I women's basketball season. The Orange were led by first-year head coach Felisha Legette-Jack. The Orange were tenth year members of the Atlantic Coast Conference and played their home games at the Carrier Dome in Syracuse, New York.

Prior to the season beginning Felisha Legette-Jack was announced as the head coach at Syracuse. She took over from interim head coach Von Read.

The Orange finished the season 20–13 overall and 9–9 in ACC play to finish in a tie for eighth place. As the ninth seed in the ACC tournament, the received a bye to the Second Round, where they lost to NC State. They received an at-large bid to the WNIT. The Orange defeated Kent State in the First Round and Seton Hall in the Second Round before losing to Columbia in the Super 16 to end their season.

== Previous season ==
Previous head coach Quentin Hillsman resigned amid investigations into allegations of inappropriate behavior on August 2, 2021. Associate Head Coach Vonn Read was named the interim head coach for the 2021–2022 season on August 4, 2021.

The Orange finished the season 11–18 overall and 4–14 in ACC play to finish in a tie for eleventh place. As the twelfth seed in the ACC tournament, they lost to Clemson in their First Round matchup. They were not invited to the NCAA tournament or the WNIT.

== Off-season ==
=== Departures ===
Departures
Name	Number	Pos.	Height	Year	Hometown	Reason for departure
Priscilla Williams	2	G	6'2"	Sophomore	Houston, Texas	Transferred to USF
Alaysia Styles	4	F	6'3"	Graduate Student	San Diego, California	Graduated
Najé Murray	10	G	5'6"	Graduate Student	Stockton, California	Graduated
Jayla Thornton	11	G	5'10"	Graduate Student	Newark, New Jersey	Graduated; Transferred to George Washington
Eboni Walker	22	F	6'0"	Junior	Las Vegas, Nevada	Transferred to Ohio State
Julianna Walker	30	G	5'6"	Freshman	Tacoma, Washington	Transferred to Seattle
Chrislyn Carr	32	G	5'5"	Senior	Davenport, Iowa	Graduated; Transferred to Louisville
Christianna Carr	43	G	6'1"	Senior	Eden Prairie, Minnesota	Graduated; Transferred to Arkansas

=== Incoming transfers ===
Incoming transfers
Name	Number	Pos.	Height	Year	Hometown	Previous school
Olivia Owens	00	F	6'4"	Graduate Student	Albany, New York	Kentucky
Dyaisha Fair	2	G	5'5"	Senior	Rochester, New York	Buffalo
Georgia Woolley	5	G	6'0"	Sophomore	Brisbane, Australia	Buffalo
Cheyenne McEvans	12	G	5'9"	Sophomore	Southfield, Michigan	Buffalo
Asia Strong	15	F	6'2"	Graduate Student	South Bend, Indiana	Wichita State
Saniaa Wilson	21	F	6'0"	Sophomore	Rochester, New York	Buffalo
Kyra Wood	22	F	6'3"	Graduate Student	Buffalo, New York	Temple
Dariauna Lewis	24	F	6'1"	Graduate Student	Omaha, Nebraska	Alabama A&M

=== Recruiting class ===
College recruiting information
Name	Hometown	School	Height	Weight	Commit date
Kennedi Perkins; G	Bolingbrook, Illinois	Bolingbrook High School	5 ft 6 in (1.68 m)	N/A	
Kennedi Perkins; G	Recruit ratings: No ratings found				
Lexi McNabb; G	Chandler, Arizona	Lincoln Prep High School	5 ft 7 in (1.70 m)	N/A	
Lexi McNabb; G	Recruit ratings: No ratings found				
Overall recruit ranking:
Note: In many cases, Scout, Rivals, 247Sports, On3, and ESPN may conflict in their listings of height and weight.; In these cases, the average was taken. ESPN grades are on a 100-point scale.; Sources:

== Roster ==
2022–23 Syracuse Orange women's basketball team
Players
Coaches

Pos.	#	Name	Height	Year	Previous school	Hometown
F	00	Olivia Owens	6 ft 4 in (1.93 m)	GS	Niskayuna; Kentucky	Albany, NY
G	1	Kennedi Perkins	5 ft 6 in (1.68 m)	Fr	Bolingbrook	Bolingbrook, IL
G	2	Dyaisha Fair	5 ft 5 in (1.65 m)	Sr	Edison Tech; Buffalo	Rochester, NY
G	3	Nyah Wilson	5 ft 8 in (1.73 m)	So	Duncanville	Dallas, TX
G	4	Teisha Hyman	5 ft 8 in (1.73 m)	RS Jr	Woodlands	White Plains, NY
G	5	Georgia Woolley	6 ft 0 in (1.83 m)	So	St Paul's School; Buffalo	Brisbane, Australia
G	10	Ava Irvin	5 ft 8 in (1.73 m)	Jr	Greater Atlanta Christian	Atlanta, GA
G	11	Lexi McNabb	5 ft 7 in (1.7 m)	Fr	Lincoln Prep	Chandler, AZ
G	12	Cheyenne McEvans	5 ft 9 in (1.75 m)	So	Southfield A&T; Buffalo	Southfield, MI
F	15	Asia Strong	6 ft 2 in (1.88 m)	GS	Riley; Wichita State	South Bend, IN
F	21	Saniaa Wilson	6 ft 0 in (1.83 m)	So	Bishop Kearney; Buffalo	Rochester, NY
F	22	Kyra Wood	6 ft 3 in (1.91 m)	So	City Honors; Temple	Buffalo, NY
F	24	Dariauna Lewis	6 ft 1 in (1.85 m)	GS	Omaha North; Alabama A&M	Omaha, NE
G	25	Alaina Rice	5 ft 8 in (1.73 m)	Jr	IMG Academy; Auburn	Rockledge, FL

Head coach

- Felisha Legette-Jack (Syracuse)

Assistant coach(es)

- Sue Ludwig (Syracuse)
- Khyreed Carter (Michigan State)
- Kristen Sharkey (Buffalo)

Legend

- (C) Team captain
- (S) Suspended
- (I) Ineligible
- (W) Walk-on
- Injured
- Current redshirt

Roster
Last update: November 1, 2022

== Schedule ==
Date time, TV	Rank^{#}	Opponent^{#}	Result	Record	Site (attendance) city, state
Exhibition
November 3, 2022*; 7:00 p.m., ACCNX		Le Moyne	W 73–70	–	JMA Wireless Dome (554); Syracuse, NY
Regular Season
November 7, 2022*; 3:30 p.m., ACCNX		Stony Brook	W 79–56	1–0	JMA Wireless Dome (1,259); Syracuse, NY
November 10, 2022*; 7:00 p.m., ACCNX		Colgate	W 72–48	2–0	JMA Wireless Dome (1,164); Syracuse, NY
November 14, 2022*; 7:00 p.m., ACCNX		Binghamton	W 92–59	3–0	JMA Wireless Dome (1,522); Syracuse, NY
November 17, 2022*; 7:00 p.m., ACCNX		LIU	W 85–63	4–0	JMA Wireless Dome (1,084); Syracuse, NY
November 21, 2022*; 7:00 p.m., BTN+		at Penn State	L 69–82	4–1	Bryce Jordan Center (1,650); University Park, PA
November 25, 2022*; 7:00 p.m., ACCNX		Bucknell	W 65–48	5–1	JMA Wireless Dome (1,363); Syracuse, NY
November 30, 2022*; 6:00 p.m., BTN		at Purdue; ACC–Big Ten Women's Challenge	L 78–87	5–2	Mackey Arena (2,521); West Lafayette, IN
December 4, 2022*; 12:00 p.m., ESPN+		at Yale	W 60–58	6–2	Payne Whitney Gymnasium; New Haven, CT
December 8, 2022*; 7:00 p.m., ACCNX		Coppin State	W 93–75	7–2	JMA Wireless Dome (1,086); Syracuse, NY
December 11, 2022*; 2:00 p.m., ACCNX		Wagner	W 83–53	8–2	JMA Wireless Dome (1,468); Syracuse, NY
December 18, 2022; 12:00 p.m., ACCN		Wake Forest	W 67–58	9–2 (1–0)	JMA Wireless Dome (1,555); Syracuse, NY
December 20, 2022*; 10:30 a.m., ACCNX		Albany	W 87–64	10–2	JMA Wireless Dome (7,311); Syracuse, NY
December 29, 2022; 7:00 p.m., ACCNX		at Louisville	L 77–86	10–3 (1–1)	KFC Yum! Center (9,025); Louisville, KY
January 1, 2023; 7:00 p.m., ACCRSN		No. 6 NC State	L 54–56	10–4 (1–2)	JMA Wireless Dome (1,994); Syracuse, NY
January 5, 2023; 6:00 p.m., ACCN		Pittsburgh	W 89–71	11–4 (2–2)	JMA Wireless Dome (1,956); Syracuse, NY
January 8, 2023; 2:00 p.m., ACCNX		at Clemson	W 91–77	12–4 (3–2)	Littlejohn Coliseum (906); Clemson, SC
January 12, 2023; 7:00 p.m., ACCNX		at Boston College	W 83–73	13–4 (4–2)	Conte Forum (964); Chestnut Hill, MA
January 15, 2023; 2:00 p.m., ACCN		No. 7 Notre Dame	L 56–72	13–5 (4–3)	JMA Wireless Dome (3,736); Syracuse, NY
January 19, 2023; 7:00 p.m., ACCNX		at Georgia Tech	L 57–69	13–6 (4–4)	McCamish Pavilion (1,920); Atlanta, GA
January 22, 2023; 12:00 p.m., ACCN		at No. 13 Duke	L 50–62	13–7 (4–5)	Cameron Indoor Stadium (2,147); Durham, NC
January 26, 2023; 7:00 p.m., ACCNX		Virginia	W 90–72	14–7 (5–5)	JMA Wireless Dome (1,606); Syracuse, NY
January 29, 2023; 7:00 p.m., ACCN		Louisville	L 67–79	14–8 (5–6)	JMA Wireless Dome (6,220); Syracuse, NY
February 2, 2023; 12:00 p.m., ACCNX		at No. 13 Virginia Tech	L 64–78	14–9 (5–7)	Cassell Coliseum (2,592); Blacksburg, VA
February 5, 2023; 2:00 p.m., ACCNX		Boston College	W 79–72	15–9 (6–7)	JMA Wireless Dome (2,723); Syracuse, NY
February 9, 2023; 7:00 p.m., ACCNX		No. 14 North Carolina	W 75–67	16–9 (7–7)	JMA Wireless Dome (1,932); Syracuse, NY
February 12, 2023; 4:00 p.m., ACCN		at No. 10 Notre Dame	L 64–73	16–10 (7–8)	Purcell Pavilion (5,239); Notre Dame, IN
February 16, 2023; 6:00 p.m., ACCN		at No. 24 Florida State	L 65–78	16–11 (7–9)	Donald L. Tucker Center (2,794); Tallahassee, FL
February 19, 2023; 1:00 p.m., ACCRSN		Miami (FL)	W 77–68	17–11 (8–9)	JMA Wireless Dome (4,566); Syracuse, NY
February 23, 2023; 6:00 p.m., ACCNX		at Pittsburgh	W 85–55	18–11 (9–9)	Peterson Events Center (517); Pittsburgh, PA
ACC Women's Tournament
March 2, 2023; 2:00 p.m., ACCN	(9)	vs. (8) NC State; Second round	L 58–83	18–12	Greensboro Coliseum (4,177); Greensboro, NC
WNIT
March 15, 2023; 7:00 p.m., ACCNX		Kent State; First round	W 84–56	19–12	JMA Wireless Dome (689); Syracuse, NY
March 20, 2023; 7:00 p.m., FloHoops		at Seton Hall; Second round	W 72–54	20–12	Walsh Gymnasium (871); South Orange, NJ
March 24, 2023; 7:00 p.m., SNY		at Columbia; Super 16	L 82–88	20–13	Levien Gymnasium (1,537); New York, NY
*Non-conference game. ^{#}Rankings from AP Poll. (#) Tournament seedings in parentheses. All times are in Eastern.

== Rankings ==
Regular season polls
Poll	Pre- Season	Week 2	Week 3	Week 4	Week 5	Week 6	Week 7	Week 8	Week 9	Week 10	Week 11	Week 12	Week 13	Week 14	Week 15	Week 16	Week 17	Week 18	Final
AP																			N/A
Coaches																			

Note: The AP does not release a final poll.

Legend
	Increase in ranking
	Decrease in ranking
	Not ranked in previous week
(RV)	Received Votes
(NR)	Not Ranked

== See also ==
- 2022–23 Syracuse Orange men's basketball team
