= 2022–23 North Carolina Tar Heels women's basketball team =

Intercollegiate basketball season

2022–23 North Carolina Tar Heels women's basketball

Phil Knight Invitational champions

NCAA tournament, Second Round
- Conference: Atlantic Coast Conference

Ranking
- Coaches: No. 21
- AP: No. 20
- Record: 22–11 (11–7 ACC)
- Head coach: Courtney Banghart (4th season)
- Assistant coaches: Joanne Aluka-White; Itoro Coleman; Adrian Walters
- Home arena: Carmichael Arena

2022–23 ACC women's basketball standings
	Conf.				Overall
Team	W		L	PCT	W		L	PCT
No. 10т Notre Dame	15	–	3	.833	27	–	6	.818
No. 13 Duke	14	–	4	.778	26	–	7	.788
No. 4 Virginia Tech †	14	–	4	.778	31	–	4	.886
Louisville	12	–	6	.667	26	–	12	.684
Florida State	12	–	6	.667	23	–	10	.697
Miami (FL)	11	–	7	.611	22	–	13	.629
No. 20 North Carolina	11	–	7	.611	22	–	11	.667
NC State	9	–	9	.500	20	–	12	.625
Syracuse	9	–	9	.500	20	–	13	.606
Clemson	7	–	11	.389	19	–	16	.543
Boston College	5	–	13	.278	16	–	17	.485
Wake Forest	5	–	13	.278	17	–	17	.500
Virginia	4	–	14	.222	15	–	15	.500
Georgia Tech	4	–	14	.222	13	–	17	.433
Pittsburgh	3	–	15	.167	10	–	20	.333
† 2023 ACC tournament winner As of March 27, 2023; Rankings from AP poll

The 2022–23 North Carolina Tar Heels women's basketball team represented the University of North Carolina at Chapel Hill in the 2022–23 NCAA Division I women's basketball season. The Tar Heels were led by head coach Courtney Banghart, who was in her fourth season. She was assisted by Joanne Aluka-White, Adrian Walters, and Itoro Coleman. The Tar Heels played their home games at Carmichael Arena as members of the Atlantic Coast Conference.

The Tar Heels finished the season 22–11 overall record and 11–7 in ACC play to finish in a tie for sixth place. As the seventh seed in the ACC tournament, they defeated Clemson in the second round before losing to rivals Duke in the quarterfinals. They received an at-large bid to the NCAA Tournament and were the six seed in the Seattle 3 Regional. They defeated eleven seed St. John's before losing to third seed Ohio State in the second round to end their season.

== Previous season ==
The Tar Heels finished the 2021–22 NCAA Division I women's basketball season with a record of 25–7. They went 13–5 in ACC play, finishing in a three-way tie for third place in the conference. Due to tiebreakers, they earned the 4th seed and a double bye in the ACC tournament. They were defeated by Virginia Tech in the quarterfinals. The Tar Heels earned the 5th seed in the Greensboro region of the NCAA tournament, making it to the Sweet Sixteen before losing to the region's number one seed, South Carolina.

== Off-season ==
=== Departures ===
Departures
Name	Number	Pos.	Height	Year	Hometown	Reason for departure
Carlie Littlefield	2	G	5'9"	Graduate student	Waukee, IA	Completed eligibliity
Morasha Wiggins	24	G	6'0"	Freshman	Kalamazoo, MI	Transferred to Arizona State
Jaelynn Murray	30	F	6'2"	(redshirt) Senior	Columbia, SC	Graduated

=== Additions ===
==== Recruiting class ====
College recruiting
Name	Hometown	School	Height	Weight	Commit date
Paulina Paris; G	Congers, NY	Saddle River Day School	5 ft 9 in (1.75 m)	N/A	Oct 30, 2021
Paulina Paris; G	Recruit ratings: ESPN: (95)				
Overall recruit ranking:
Note: In many cases, Scout, Rivals, 247Sports, On3, and ESPN may conflict in their listings of height and weight.; In these cases, the average was taken. ESPN grades are on a 100-point scale.; Sources:

== Roster ==
2022–23 North Carolina Tar Heels women's basketball team
Players
Coaches

Pos.	#	Name	Height	Year	Previous school	Hometown
F	0	Alexandria Zelaya	6 ft 4 in (1.93 m)	Jr	Millennium	Goodyear, AZ
G	1	Alyssa Ustby	6 ft 1 in (1.85 m)	Jr	Lourdes	Rochester, MN
G	2	Paulina Paris	5 ft 9 in (1.75 m)	Fr	Saddle River Day School	Congers, NY
G	3	Kennedy Todd-Williams	6 ft 0 in (1.83 m)	Jr	Jacksonville	Jacksonville, NC
G	10	Eva Hodgson	5 ft 10 in (1.78 m)	RS Sr	New Hampton School; William & Mary	Rindge, NH
G	11	Ariel Young	6 ft 1 in (1.85 m)	RS Sr	Lincoln; Michigan	Tallahassee, FL
G/F	13	Teonni Key	6 ft 4 in (1.93 m)	RS Fr	Cary	Cary, NC
G	14	Kayla McPherson	5 ft 8 in (1.73 m)	RS Fr	Madison County	Hull, GA
G/F	20	Destiny Adams	6 ft 3 in (1.91 m)	So	Manchester Township	Whiting, NJ
F	21	Malu Tshitenge	6 ft 3 in (1.91 m)	Sr	St. John's College	Germantown, MD
G	25	Deja Kelly	5 ft 8 in (1.73 m)	Jr	Duncanville	San Antonio, TX
F	31	Anya Poole	6 ft 2 in (1.88 m)	Jr	Southeast Raleigh	Raleigh, NC

Head coach

- Courtney Banghart (Dartmouth)

Assistant coach(es)

- Joanne Aluka-White (Middle Tennessee)
- Adrian Walters (Saint Francis (PA))
- Itoro Coleman (Clemson)

Legend

- (C) Team captain
- (S) Suspended
- (I) Ineligible
- (W) Walk-on
- Injured
- Current redshirt

Roster
Last update: July 6, 2022

== Schedule ==
Date time, TV	Rank^{#}	Opponent^{#}	Result	Record	Site (attendance) city, state
Non-conference regular season
November 9, 2022*; 7:00 p.m., ACCNX	No. 12	Jackson State	W 91–59	1–0	Carmichael Arena (2,315); Chapel Hill, NC
November 12, 2022*; 1:00 p.m., ACCNX	No. 12	TCU	W 75–48	2–0	Carmichael Arena (2,015); Chapel Hill, NC
November 16, 2022*; 11:00 a.m., ACCNX	No. 13	South Carolina State	W 93–25	3–0	Carmichael Arena (2,293); Chapel Hill, NC
November 20, 2022*; 2:00 p.m., ESPN+	No. 13	at James Madison	W 76–65	4–0	Atlantic Union Bank Center (2,255); Harrisonburg, VA
November 24, 2022*; 5:00 p.m., ESPNU	No. 8	vs. No. 18 Oregon; Phil Knight Invitational semifinals	W 85–79	5–0	Chiles Center; Portland, OR
November 27, 2022*; 7:30 p.m., ESPN2	No. 8	vs. No. 5 Iowa State; Phil Knight Invitational championship	W 73–64	6–0	Moda Center; Portland, OR
December 1, 2022*; 6:00 p.m., BTN	No. 6	at No. 5 Indiana; Big Ten/ACC Challenge	L 63–87	6–1	Simon Skjodt Assembly Hall (5,939); Bloomington, IN
December 7, 2022*; 6:00 p.m., ACCNX	No. 8	UNCW	W 64–42	7–1	Carmichael Arena (1,918); Chapel Hill, NC
December 11, 2022*; 1:00 p.m., ACCNX	No. 8	Wofford	W 99–67	8–1	Carmichael Arena (1,934); Chapel Hill, NC
December 16, 2022*; 6:00 p.m., ACCNX	No. 7	USC Upstate	W 89–47	9–1	Carmichael Arena (1,688); Chapel Hill, NC
December 20, 2022*; 7:00 p.m., ESPN2	No. 6	vs. No. 19 Michigan; Jumpman Invitational	L 68–76	9–2	Spectrum Center; Charlotte, NC
ACC regular season
December 29, 2022; 8:00 p.m., ACCRSN	No. 13	Florida State	L 71–78	9–3 (0–1)	Carmichael Arena (2,237); Chapel Hill, NC
January 1, 2023; 4:00 p.m., ACCN	No. 13	at No. 7 Virginia Tech	L 65–68	9–4 (0–2)	Cassell Coliseum (4,186); Blacksburg, VA
January 5, 2023; 6:00 p.m., ACCNX	No. 22	at Miami (FL)	L 58–62	9–5 (0–3)	Watsco Center (2,044); Coral Gables, FL
January 8, 2023; 4:00 p.m., ACCN	No. 22	No. 4 Notre Dame	W 60–50	10–5 (1–3)	Carmichael Arena (3,976); Chapel Hill, NC
January 12, 2023; 7:00 p.m., ACCNX	No. 22	at Virginia	W 70–59	11–5 (2–3)	John Paul Jones Arena (3,191); Charlottesville, VA
January 15, 2023; 3:30 p.m., ESPN	No. 22	No. 11 NC State; Rivalry	W 56–47	12–5 (3–3)	Carmichael Arena (6,319); Chapel Hill, NC
January 19, 2023; 8:00 p.m., ACCN	No. 17	No. 13 Duke; Rivalry	W 61–56	13–5 (4–3)	Carmichael Arena (5,003); Chapel Hill, NC
January 22, 2023; 4:00 p.m., ACCN	No. 17	Georgia Tech	W 70–57	14–5 (5–3)	Carmichael Arena (4,418); Chapel Hill, NC
January 26, 2023; 6:00 p.m., ACCNX	No. 15	at Pittsburgh	W 72–57	15–5 (6–3)	Petersen Events Center (571); Pittsburgh, PA
January 29, 2023; 4:00 p.m., ACCN	No. 15	at Clemson	W 69–58	16–5 (7–3)	Littlejohn Coliseum (2,556); Clemson, SC
February 2, 2023; 6:00 p.m., ACCRSN	No. 11	Virginia	W 73–62	17–5 (8–3)	Carmichael Arena (2,490); Chapel Hill, NC
February 5, 2023; 12:00 p.m., ESPN2	No. 11	at Louisville	L 55–62	17–6 (8–4)	KFC Yum! Center (10,069); Louisville, KY
February 9, 2023; 7:00 p.m., ACCNX	No. 14	at Syracuse	L 67–75	17–7 (8–5)	Carrier Dome (1,932); Syracuse, NY
February 12, 2023; 12:00 p.m., ACCN	No. 14	Boston College	W 73–55	18–7 (9–5)	Carmichael Arena (2,841); Chapel Hill, NC
February 16, 2023; 8:00 p.m., ACCN	No. 19	at NC State; Rivalry	L 66–77 ^{OT}	18–8 (9–6)	Reynolds Coliseum (5,500); Raleigh, NC
February 19, 2023; 4:00 p.m., ACCN	No. 19	Wake Forest	W 71–58	19–8 (10–6)	Carmichael Arena (3,724); Chapel Hill, NC
February 23, 2023; 8:00 p.m., ACCRSN	No. 22	No. 9 Virginia Tech	L 59–61	19–9 (10–7)	Carmichael Arena (2,908); Chapel Hill, NC
February 26, 2023; 12:00 p.m., ACCRSN	No. 22	at No. 11 Duke; Rivalry	W 45–41	20–9 (11–7)	Cameron Indoor Stadium (9,314); Durham, NC
ACC Tournament
March 2, 2023; 6:00 p.m., ACCN	(7) No. 18	vs. (10) Clemson; Second Round	W 68–58	21–9	Greensboro Coliseum (4,578); Greensboro, NC
March 3, 2023; 6:00 p.m., ACCN	(7) No. 18	vs. (2) No. 13 Duke; Quarterfinals/Rivalry	L 40–44	21–10	Greensboro Coliseum (7,823); Greensboro, NC
NCAA Tournament
March 18, 2023*; 4:00 p.m., ESPN	(6 S3) No. 20	vs. (11 S3) St. John's; First Round	W 61–59	22–10	Value City Arena (6,828); Columbus, OH
March 20, 2023*; 4:00 p.m., ESPN	(6 S3) No. 20	at (3 S3) No. 12 Ohio State; Second Round	L 69–71	22–11	Value City Arena (5,186); Columbus, OH
*Non-conference game. ^{#}Rankings from AP Poll. (#) Tournament seedings in parentheses. S3=Seattle 3. All times are in Eastern.

== Rankings ==
Regular season polls
Poll	Pre- season	Week 2	Week 3	Week 4	Week 5	Week 6	Week 7	Week 8	Week 9	Week 10	Week 11	Week 12	Week 13	Week 14	Week 15	Week 16	Week 17	Week 18	Week 19	Final
AP	12	13	8	6	8т	7	6	13	22	22	17	15	11	14	19	22	18	19	20	N/A
Coaches	12	13	10	6	9	7	7	12	18	22	20	19	14	16	17	21	19	19	19	21

Note: The AP does not release a final poll.

Legend
	Increase in ranking
	Decrease in ranking
	Not ranked previous week
(RV)	Received votes

== See also ==
- 2022–23 North Carolina Tar Heels men's basketball team
