= 2022–23 Wake Forest Demon Deacons women's basketball team =

Intercollegiate basketball season

2022–23 Wake Forest Demon Deacons women's basketball

WNIT, Second round
- Conference: Atlantic Coast Conference
- Record: 17–17 (5–13 ACC)
- Head coach: Megan Gebbia (1st season)
- Assistant coaches: Nikki Flores; Emily Stallings; Millette Green
- Home arena: LJVM Coliseum

2022–23 ACC women's basketball standings
	Conf.				Overall
Team	W		L	PCT	W		L	PCT
No. 10т Notre Dame	15	–	3	.833	27	–	6	.818
No. 13 Duke	14	–	4	.778	26	–	7	.788
No. 4 Virginia Tech †	14	–	4	.778	31	–	4	.886
Louisville	12	–	6	.667	26	–	12	.684
Florida State	12	–	6	.667	23	–	10	.697
Miami (FL)	11	–	7	.611	22	–	13	.629
No. 20 North Carolina	11	–	7	.611	22	–	11	.667
NC State	9	–	9	.500	20	–	12	.625
Syracuse	9	–	9	.500	20	–	13	.606
Clemson	7	–	11	.389	19	–	16	.543
Boston College	5	–	13	.278	16	–	17	.485
Wake Forest	5	–	13	.278	17	–	17	.500
Virginia	4	–	14	.222	15	–	15	.500
Georgia Tech	4	–	14	.222	13	–	17	.433
Pittsburgh	3	–	15	.167	10	–	20	.333
† 2023 ACC tournament winner As of March 27, 2023; Rankings from AP poll

The 2022–23 Wake Forest Demon Deacons women's basketball team represented Wake Forest University during the 2022–23 NCAA Division I women's basketball season. The Demon Deacons, led by first-year head coach Megan Gebbia, competed as members of the Atlantic Coast Conference and played their home games at the Lawrence Joel Veterans Memorial Coliseum.

Prior to the season, Wake Forest fired head coach Jen Hoover after ten seasons. Megan Gebbia was announced as the new head coach on May 26, 2022.

The Demon Deacons finished the season 17–17 overall and 5–13 in ACC play to finish in a tie for eleventh place. As the twelfth seed in the ACC tournament, they defeated thirteenth seed Virginia in the first round and fifth seed Florida State in the second round before losing to fourth seed Louisville in the quarterfinals. They received an at-large bid to the WNIT. They defeated Morgan State in the first round before losing to Florida in the second round to end their season.

== Previous season ==
The Demon Deacons finished the season 16–17 overall and 4–14 in ACC play to finish in a tie for eleventh place. As the eleventh seed in the ACC tournament, they defeated fourteenth seed Virginia in the first round before losing to sixth seed Georgia Tech in the second round. They received an at-large bid to the WNIT. They defeated Akron in the first round before losing to Middle Tennessee in the second round to end their season.

== Off-season ==
=== Departures ===
Departures
Name	Number	Pos.	Height	Year	Hometown	Reason for departure
Kaylen Dickson	12	G	5'11"	Senior	Gurnee, Illinois	Graduated
Christina Morra	23	F	6'2"	Senior	Toronto, Canada	Graduated

=== Recruiting class ===
College recruiting
Name	Hometown	School	Height	Weight	Commit date
Skye Owen; G	Staten Island, New York	St. Francis Preparatory School	5 ft 7 in (1.70 m)	N/A	
Skye Owen; G	Recruit ratings: ESPN: (90)				
Kate Deeble; G	Brisbane, Australia	BA Centre of Excellence	5 ft 8 in (1.73 m)	N/A	
Kate Deeble; G	Recruit ratings: No ratings found				
Overall recruit ranking:
Note: In many cases, Scout, Rivals, 247Sports, On3, and ESPN may conflict in their listings of height and weight.; In these cases, the average was taken. ESPN grades are on a 100-point scale.; Sources:

== Roster ==
2022–23 Wake Forest Demon Deacons women's basketball team
Players
Coaches

Pos.	#	Name	Height	Year	Previous school	Hometown
G	0	Alyssa Andrews	6 ft 0 in (1.83 m)	So	Colgan	Woodbridge, VA
G	2	Kaia Harrison	5 ft 7 in (1.7 m)	Sr	Baldwin	Baldwin, NY
G	3	Mack Maier	5 ft 10 in (1.78 m)	Sr	Chaparral	Parker, CO
G	4	Aliah McWhorter	6 ft 1 in (1.85 m)	Jr	Sycamore	Cincinnati, OH
G	5	Malaya Cowles	6 ft 3 in (1.91 m)	So	Winston-Salem Christian	Wilkesboro, NC
G	11	Raegyn Conley	6 ft 0 in (1.83 m)	So	Baylor School	Chattanooga, TN
G	12	Kate Deeble	5 ft 8 in (1.73 m)	Fr	BA Centre of Excellence	Brisbane, Australia
F	13	Marta Morales	6 ft 1 in (1.85 m)	So	Segle XXI	Barcelona, Spain
G	14	Niyah Becker	6 ft 2 in (1.88 m)	Sr	Lincoln Prep; Utah	Winnipeg, Canada
F	20	Olivia Summiel	6 ft 2 in (1.88 m)	Sr	Marianapolis Prep	Dayville, CT
G	21	Elise Williams	5 ft 9 in (1.75 m)	So	Wakefield	Raleigh, NC
G	24	Jewel Spear	5 ft 10 in (1.78 m)	Jr	The Colony	The Colony, TX
F	25	DeMeara Hinds	6 ft 2 in (1.88 m)	Jr	Lithia Springs	Douglasville, GA
G	32	Alexandria Scruggs	5 ft 10 in (1.78 m)	Sr	E. E. Smith	Fayetteville, NC

Head coach

- Megan Gebbia (Towson)

Assistant coach(es)

- Nikki Flores (Marist)
- Emily Stallings (East Stroudsburg)
- Millette Green (UMBC)

Legend

- (C) Team captain
- (S) Suspended
- (I) Ineligible
- (W) Walk-on
- Injured
- Current redshirt

Roster
Last update: November 3, 2022

== Schedule ==
Date time, TV	Rank^{#}	Opponent^{#}	Result	Record	Site (attendance) city, state
Exhibition
October 30, 2022*; 4:00 p.m.		Winston-Salem State	W 93–50	–	LJVM Coliseum; Winston-Salem, NC
Regular season
November 7, 2022*; 5:00 p.m., ACCNX		Elon	W 76–56	1–0	LJVM Coliseum (542); Winston-Salem, NC
November 10, 2022*; 6:00 p.m., ESPN+		at East Carolina	W 57–46	2–0	Williams Arena (991); Greenville, NC
November 13, 2022; 2:00 p.m., ACCN		at Virginia	L 52–72	2–1 (0–1)	John Paul Jones Arena (2,868); Charlottesville, VA
November 17, 2022*; 11:00 a.m., ACCNX		Mercer	W 70–45	3–1	LJVM Coliseum (3,703); Winston-Salem, NC
November 21, 2022*; 5:30 p.m., FloHoops		vs. Missouri; Baha Mar Hoops Pink Flamingo Championship	L 47–69	3–2	Baha Mar Convention Center (517); Nassau, Bahamas
November 23, 2022*; 11:00 a.m., FloHoops		vs. Alabama; Baha Mar Hoops Pink Flamingo Championship	L 58–61	3–3	Baha Mar Convention Center; Nassau, Bahamas
November 27, 2022*; 4:00 p.m., ACCN		Coastal Carolina	W 76–61	4–3	LJVM Coliseum (814); Winston-Salem, NC
November 30, 2022*; 8:00 p.m., BTN		at Minnesota; ACC–Big Ten Women's Challenge	W 63–59	5–3	Williams Arena (2,177); Minneapolis, MN
December 3, 2022*; 6:00 p.m., ACCNX		High Point	W 68–51	6–3	LJVM Coliseum (754); Winston-Salem, NC
December 11, 2022*; 2:00 p.m., ESPN+		at Charlotte	W 63–54	7–3	Dale F. Halton Arena (834); Charlotte, NC
December 15, 2022*; 6:00 p.m., ACCNX		Longwood	W 83–43	8–3	LJVM Coliseum (584); Winston-Salem, NC
December 18, 2022; 12:00 p.m., ACCN		at Syracuse	L 58–67	8–4 (0–2)	JMA Wireless Dome (1,555); Syracuse, NY
December 22, 2022*; 1:00 p.m., ACCNX		Rhode Island	W 59–45	9–4	LJVM Coliseum (691); Winston-Salem, NC
December 29, 2022; 6:00 p.m., ACCNX		Pittsburgh	W 66–51	10–4 (1–2)	LJVM Coliseum (858); Winston-Salem, NC
January 1, 2023; 2:00 p.m., ACCN		at Clemson	L 59–60	10–5 (1–3)	Littlejohn Coliseum (958); Clemson, SC
January 5, 2023; 6:00 p.m., ACCNX		No. 19 Duke	L 50–60	10–6 (1–4)	LJVM Coliseum (1,050); Winston-Salem, NC
January 8, 2023; 2:00 p.m., ACC		Georgia Tech	W 51–50	11–6 (2–4)	LJVM Coliseum; Winston-Salem, NC
January 12, 2023; 7:00 p.m., ACCNX		at No. 7 Notre Dame	L 47–86	11–7 (2–5)	Purcell Pavilion (4,319); Notre Dame, IN
January 15, 2023; 2:00 p.m., ACCNX		at Miami (FL)	L 43–55	11–8 (2–6)	Watsco Center (1,892); Coral Gables, FL
January 22, 2023; 1:00 p.m., ACCRSN		at No. 12 Virginia Tech	L 57–74	11–9 (2–7)	Cassell Coliseum (3,209); Blacksburg, VA
January 26, 2023; 6:00 p.m., ACCN		Louisville	W 68–57	12–9 (3–7)	LJVM Coliseum (857); Winston-Salem, NC
January 29, 2023; 2:00 p.m., ACCNX		Miami (FL)	W 55–52	13–9 (4–7)	LJVM Coliseum (1,225); Winston-Salem, NC
February 2, 2023; 6:00 p.m., ACCNX		at No. 23 Florida State	L 44–72	13–10 (4–8)	Donald L. Tucker Center (2,042); Tallahassee, FL
February 5, 2023; 4:00 p.m., ACCN		Clemson	W 69–64 ^{OT}	14–10 (5–8)	LJVM Coliseum (1,039); Winston-Salem, NC
February 9, 2023; 8:00 p.m., ACCN		No. 22 NC State	L 42–51	14–11 (5–9)	LJVM Coliseum (957); Winston-Salem, NC
February 16, 2023; 7:00 p.m., ACCNX		at Georgia Tech	L 55–63	14–12 (5–10)	McCamish Pavilion (1,221); Atlanta, GA
February 19, 2023; 4:00 p.m., ACCN		at No. 19 North Carolina	L 58–71	14–13 (5–11)	Carmichael Arena (3,724); Chapel Hill, NC
February 23, 2023; 6:00 p.m., ACCNX		No. 23 Florida State	L 60–61	14–14 (5–12)	LJVM Coliseum (680); Winston-Salem, NC
February 26, 2023; 2:00 p.m., ACCNX		Boston College	L 63–73	14–15 (5–13)	LJVM Coliseum (1,077); Winston-Salem, NC
ACC Women's Tournament
March 1, 2023; 1:00 p.m., ACCN	(12)	vs. (13) Virginia; First round	W 68–57	15–15	Greensboro Coliseum (3,879); Greensboro, NC
March 2, 2023; 11:00 a.m., ACCN	(12)	vs. (5) Florida State; Second round	W 65–54	16–15	Greensboro Coliseum (4,177); Greensboro, NC
March 3, 2023; 11:00 a.m., ACCN	(12)	vs. (4) Louisville; Quarterfinals	L 48–74	16–16	Greensboro Coliseum (6,151); Greensboro, NC
WNIT
March 16, 2023; 6:00 p.m., ACCNX		Morgan State; First round	W 75–49	17–16	LJVM Coliseum (731); Winston-Salem, NC
March 20, 2023; 6:00 p.m., ACCNX		Florida; Second round	L 63–80	17–17	LJVM Coliseum (701); Winston-Salem, NC
*Non-conference game. ^{#}Rankings from AP Poll. (#) Tournament seedings in parentheses. All times are in Eastern.

== Rankings ==
Regular season polls
Poll	Pre- season	Week 2	Week 3	Week 4	Week 5	Week 6	Week 7	Week 8	Week 9	Week 10	Week 11	Week 12	Week 13	Week 14	Week 15	Week 16	Week 17	Week 18	Final
AP																			N/A
Coaches																			

Note: The AP does not release a final poll.

Legend
	Increase in ranking
	Decrease in ranking
	Not ranked in previous week
(RV)	Received votes
(NR)	Not ranked

== See also ==
- 2022–23 Wake Forest Demon Deacons men's basketball team
