= Influencer =

Person influential on social media

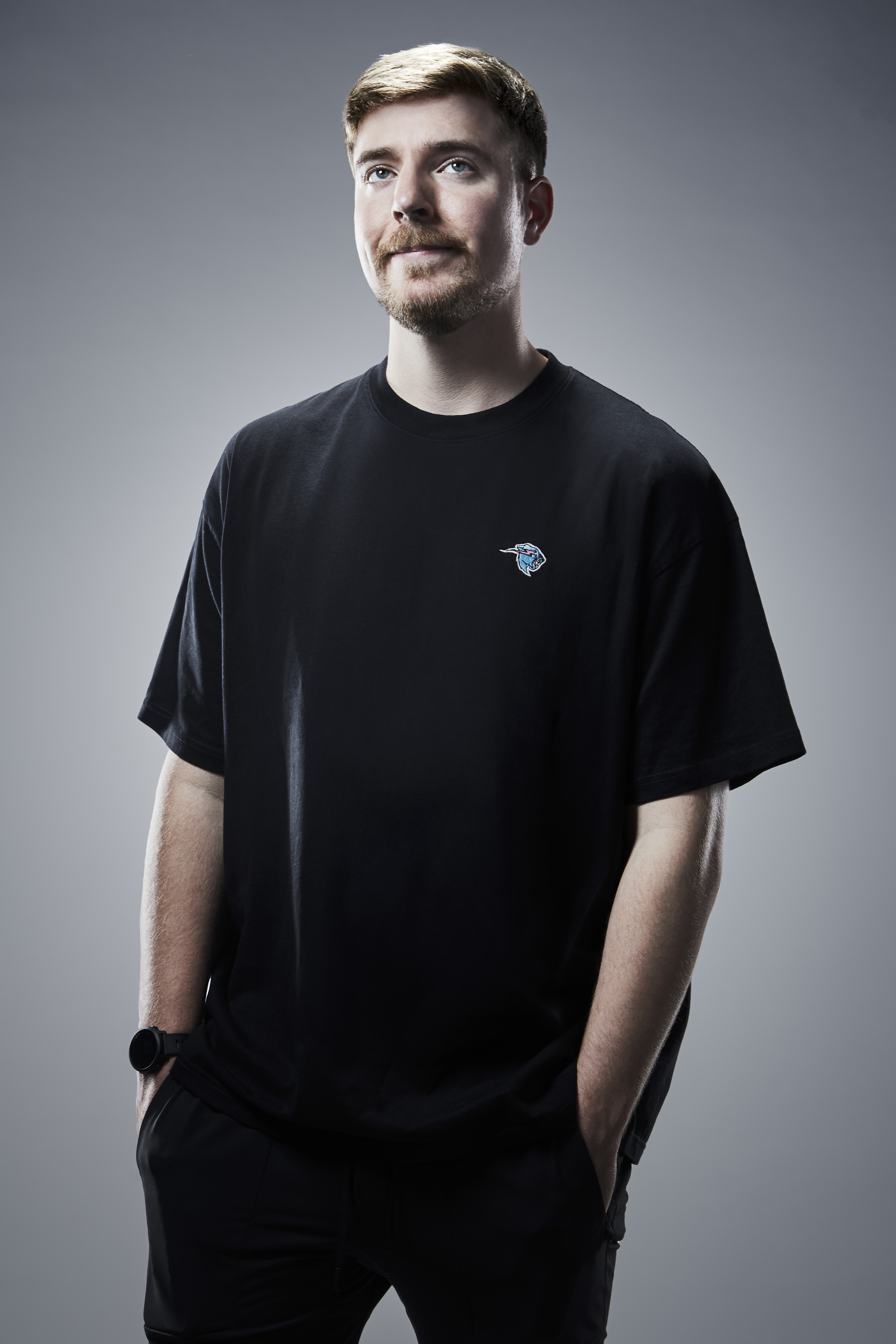
MrBeast is the most-subscribed YouTuber, with over 510 million subscribers.

An influencer is someone who has the ability to alter the attitudes, behaviour, or decisions of others through authority, knowledge, position, or the nature of their relationship with the audience. Such ability is either inherent to their personality or is constructed by others for benefit. This benefit can be either social, personal, and or economical. The term 'influencer' is used in fields such as media, business, politics, religion, and communication, referring to people such as social media influencers, podcasters, public speakers, religious influencers, writers, and newsletter writers who have dedicated followings in various areas.

One writer defines influencers as "a range of third parties who exercise influence over the organization and its potential customers." Another defines an influencer as a "third party who significantly shapes the customer's purchasing decision but may never be accountable for it." According to another writer, influencers are "well-connected, create an impact, have active minds, and are trendsetters". Just because a person has many followers does not necessarily mean they have much influence over those people.

In contemporary usage, the term frequently refers to a social media influencer or online influencer, a person who builds a grassroots online presence through engaging content such as photos, videos, and updates. This is done by using direct audience interaction to establish authenticity, expertise, and appeal, and by standing apart from traditional celebrities by growing their platform through social media rather than pre-existing fame. The modern referent of the term is commonly a paid role in which a business entity pays for the social media influence-for-hire activity to promote its products and services, known as influencer marketing. A 1% increase in spending on influencer marketing can lead to a 0.5% increase in audience engagement. As such, an influencer effectively acts as a modern salesperson or a marketer. Types of influencers include fashion influencer, travel influencer, and virtual influencer, and they involve content creators and streamers.

Some influencers are associated primarily with specific social media apps such as TikTok, Instagram, or Pinterest; many influencers are also considered internet celebrities. As of 2023, Instagram is the social media platform businesses spend the most advertising money towards marketing with influencers. However, influencers can have an impact on any social media network.

== History ==
=== Origins ===
The word influencer in its general sense of a person or thing that exerts influence, is attested in historical sources at least since the 17th century. The Oxford English Dictionary (OED) gives 1664 as the earliest example of usage and cites a sentence from Henry More's A Modest Enquiry into the Mystery of Iniquity: "The head and influencer of the whole Church".

The origins of online influencing can be traced back to the emergence of digital blogs and platforms in the early 2000s. Nevertheless, recent studies demonstrate that Instagram, an application with more than one billion users, harbors the majority of the influencer demographic. These individuals are sometimes referred to as "Instagrammers" or "Instafamous". A crucial aspect of influencing is their association with sponsors. The 2015 debut of Vamp, a company that links influencers with sponsorships, transformed the landscape of influencing.

There is much debate about whether social media influencers can be considered celebrities, as their path to fame is often less traditional and arguably easier. Melody Nouri addressed the differences between the two types in her article "The Power of Influence: Traditional Celebrities vs Social Media Influencer". Nouri asserts that social media platforms have a greater negative impact on young, impressionable audiences in comparison with traditional media such as magazines, billboards, advertisements, and tabloids featuring celebrities. Online, it is thought to be simpler to manipulate an image and lifestyle in such a way that viewers are more susceptible to believing it.

One theory considers the former American First Lady Eleanor Roosevelt (1884–1962) to be the "original media influencer." While she achieved celebrity in her role as First Lady, she built a global personal brand as a wise, informative, trustworthy American woman. Her voice was her own, unrestricted by political advisors and powerful men, and with it, Roosevelt exerted unprecedented social and cultural influence in radio, print, public speaking, film, and television until she died. In one notable example, it may have been Roosevelt's television support of John F. Kennedy which nudged his "hairline victory" during the 1960 Presidential campaign. In another example, David Ogilvy paid Roosevelt more than a quarter of a million dollars in today's currency to make a TV commercial for Good Luck margarine (1959), in which Roosevelt also managed to mention world hunger. As a content creator, she wrote My Day, a popular daily newspaper column that ran nationwide for twenty-six years. Like a social media post, My Day covered all aspects of her life, and in it Roosevelt often recommended movies, books, and products that she admired. Roosevelt also had a hand in designing all three of her public affairs television shows. Unlike contemporary influencers, she was less motivated by a pay-to-play situation than by a desire to educate and inspire; but she did use her influence to benefit the entertainment industry careers of her children, and she welcomed the revenue that her influence bought, most of which was donated to charity.

=== 2000s ===
The early 2000s showed corporate endeavors to leverage the internet for influence, with some companies participating in forums for promotions or providing bloggers with complimentary products in return for favorable reviews. A few of these practices were viewed as unethical for taking advantage of the labor of young individuals without providing remuneration. In 2004, The Blogstar Network was established by Ted Murphy of MindComet. Bloggers were encouraged to join an email list and receive remunerated offers from corporations in exchange for creating specific posts. For instance, bloggers were compensated for writing reviews of fast-food meals on their blogs. Blogstar is widely regarded as the first influencer marketing network.

Murphy succeeded Blogstar with PayPerPost, which was introduced in 2006. This platform compensated significant posters on prominent forums and social media platforms for every post made about a corporate product. Payment rates were determined by the influencer's status. Though very popular, PayPerPost, received a great deal of criticism as these influencers were not required to disclose their involvement with PayPerPost as traditional journalism would have. With the success of PayPerPost, the public became aware that there was a drive for corporate interests to influence what some people were posting to these sites. The platform also incentivized other firms to establish comparable programs.

Despite concerns, marketing networks with influencers continued to grow throughout the 2000s and into the 2010s. The influencer marketing industry was worth as much as $8 billion in 2019, according to estimates from Business Insider Intelligence, which are based on Mediakix data. Evan Asano, the Former CEO and founder of the agency Mediakix, previously spoke with Business Insider and said he believed influencer marketing on Instagram would continue to grow despite likes being hidden.

=== 2010s ===
By the 2010s, the term "influencer" described digital content creators with a large following, distinctive brand persona, and a patterned relationship with commercial sponsors. By this period, influencer marketing had become a widely researched field globally, with systematic reviews drawing on hundreds of studies that documented the growing role of authenticity, audience engagement, and parasocial relationships in shaping how consumers responded to influencer content across different markets.

During this period, influencer culture also developed through distinct channels outside Western markets. In South Korea, the global spread of Korean pop culture, also called K-Pop, through platforms such as YouTube, Facebook, and Twitter gave rise to what scholars have called 'Hallyu 2.0' or the 'New Korean Wave', where fans throughout Southeast Asia, North America, Latin America, and Europe shared, subtitled, and redistributed Korean music and film content on a large scale. This helped Korean entertainers to build substantial followings internationally.

Consumers often mistakenly view celebrities as reliable, leading to trust and confidence in the products being promoted. A 2001 study from Rutgers University discovered that individuals were using "internet forums as influential sources of consumer information." The study proposes that consumers preferred internet forums and social media when making purchasing decisions over conventional advertising and print sources. An influencer's personality strongly impacts their audience's purchasing decision, with those who engage with their audience being more persuasive in encouraging product purchases. Companies today place great importance on feedback and comments received through social media platforms as consumers trust other consumers. Reviews are often relied on to persuade consumers to make a purchase, highlighting the impact of a negative review on a business's revenue.

=== 2020s ===
Influencer marketing saw significant changes in the 2020s due to changes in platform usage and content consumption. Social media influencer culture has been linked to conspicuous consumption and materialism driven by followers' fear of missing out. By 2020, TikTok was available in over 150 countries and 39 languages, with influencer marketing expanding worldwide, across Asia-Pacific markets, the United States, and Europe, as creators built large audiences through the platform's content recommendation algorithm. With over a billion active users by 2021, TikTok introduced an algorithm-driven model that enables creators to reach large audiences regardless of the number of followers. Short-form video became the most popular format for influencer content when Instagram and YouTube responded with Reels and Shorts, respectively. Marketers quickly changed their tactics to put short, powerful content ahead of conventional long-form sponsorships.

Compared to celebrity endorsers, brands are increasingly focusing their resources on micro-influencers (10,000–100,000 followers) and nano-influencers (1,000–10,000 followers). Over the course of the decade, research revealed that these smaller creators had higher engagement rates and were perceived by their audiences as more relatable and credible. To assist brands in effectively managing vast networks of niche creators, specialized platforms like AspireIQ and Grin have emerged.

Increased regulatory scrutiny of influencer advertising transparency was another development of the decade. In 2022 and 2023, the FTC updated its endorsement guidelines, requiring creators involved in gifted arrangements and paid promotions to disclose more information.

== Influencer marketing ==
A typical method of marketing between the influencer and the audience is "B2C marketing". B2C marketing, meaning Business-to-Consumer marketing, entails the strategies which a business would undertake to promote themselves and their services directly to their target audiences. This is typically through advertising and creating content through the influencer themselves. The intention is that their followers, who relate or look up to certain influencers, will be more inclined to purchase an item because their favorite "Internet celebrity" recommended it. Social media influencers typically promote a lifestyle of beauty and luxury fashion and foster consumer–brand relationships, while selling their own lines of merchandise.

Research has found that Instagram influencers with larger followings are often perceived as more popular and likable. However, promoting products through influencers with large followings can sometimes negatively affect consumers' perceptions of a brand's uniqueness.

David Rowles explains the methods online influencers employ to increase their audience and brand visibility. Digital branding encompasses all online experiences and necessitates value provision."

Influencer marketing is a form of marketing in which advertisers or brand representatives collaborate with influencers and, through them, promote their services on social media. Influencer marketing differs from the classic advertising strategy, in which a well-known person endorses a product or service, in the way the message is communicated. In influencer marketing, product advertising is embedded in materials created by the influencer and often does not differ from the content they regularly produce.

However, many influencer-brand partnerships complicate how authentic an influencer appears to their followers. When influencers gained followers, they were perceived as "regular" consumers who posted content that was not commercial in nature, which results in their content being more reliable than traditional advertising. Brand partnerships may pose a threat to the authenticity of the influencer's content because the audience may begin to perceive the content as either a reflection of the influencer's true opinion or as it being a commercial obligation. According to the research available, influencers deal with this issue in one of two ways: by either working with brands whose values are consistent with theirs (passionate authenticity) or by being transparent about the commercial nature of the content they post to their followers (transparent authenticity).

One of the earliest definitions of a social media influencer was proposed by Karen Freberg as "representing a new type of independent third-party endorser who shapes audience attitudes through blogs, tweets, and the use of other social media". Campbell and Grimm supplemented this definition with the element of "publishing content in exchange for compensation".

Currently, two main categories of influencers are distinguished:

- human influencers (HI)
- virtual influencers (VI). In relation to virtual influencers, the abbreviation AIIs (artificially intelligent influencers) is also used.

=== Self-branding ===
Self-branding, also known as personal branding, describes the development of a public image for commercial gain or social or cultural capital. The rise of social media has been exploited by individuals seeking personal fame and product sales. Platforms such as Instagram, Twitch, Snapchat, VSCO, YouTube, and TikTok, are the most common social media outlets on which online influencers attempt to build a following. Fame can be attained through different avenues and media forms, including art, humor, modeling, books and podcasts. Marketing experts have concluded that anyone can build websites easily without any technical knowledge or complex coding languages. They can upload text, pictures, and videos instantly from personal computers or phones. With technological barriers diminishing, the web has become a platform for personal branding.

== Types of influencers ==
Market research techniques can be used to identify influencers, using predefined criteria to determine the extent and type of influence. "Activists" get involved with organizations, for example, their communities, political movements, and charities. Especially in the West, social media allows marginalized influencers to promote legal changes through their creations. In countries where there is less legal representation for marginalized communities, influencers that are a part of these communities are more likely to use their platform to work through and survive discrimination. "Connected influencers" have large social networks. "Authoritative influencers" are trusted by others. "Active minds" have a diverse range of interests. "Trendsetters" are the early adopters (or leavers) of markets. According to Malcolm Gladwell, "The success of any kind of social epidemic is heavily dependent on the involvement of people with a particular and rare set of social gifts". He has identified types of influencers who are responsible for the "generation, communication, and adoption" of messages; connectors network with a variety of people, have a wide reach, and are essential to word-of-mouth communication; mavens use information, share it with others, and are insightful about trends.

=== Student athletes ===
Student athlete influencers

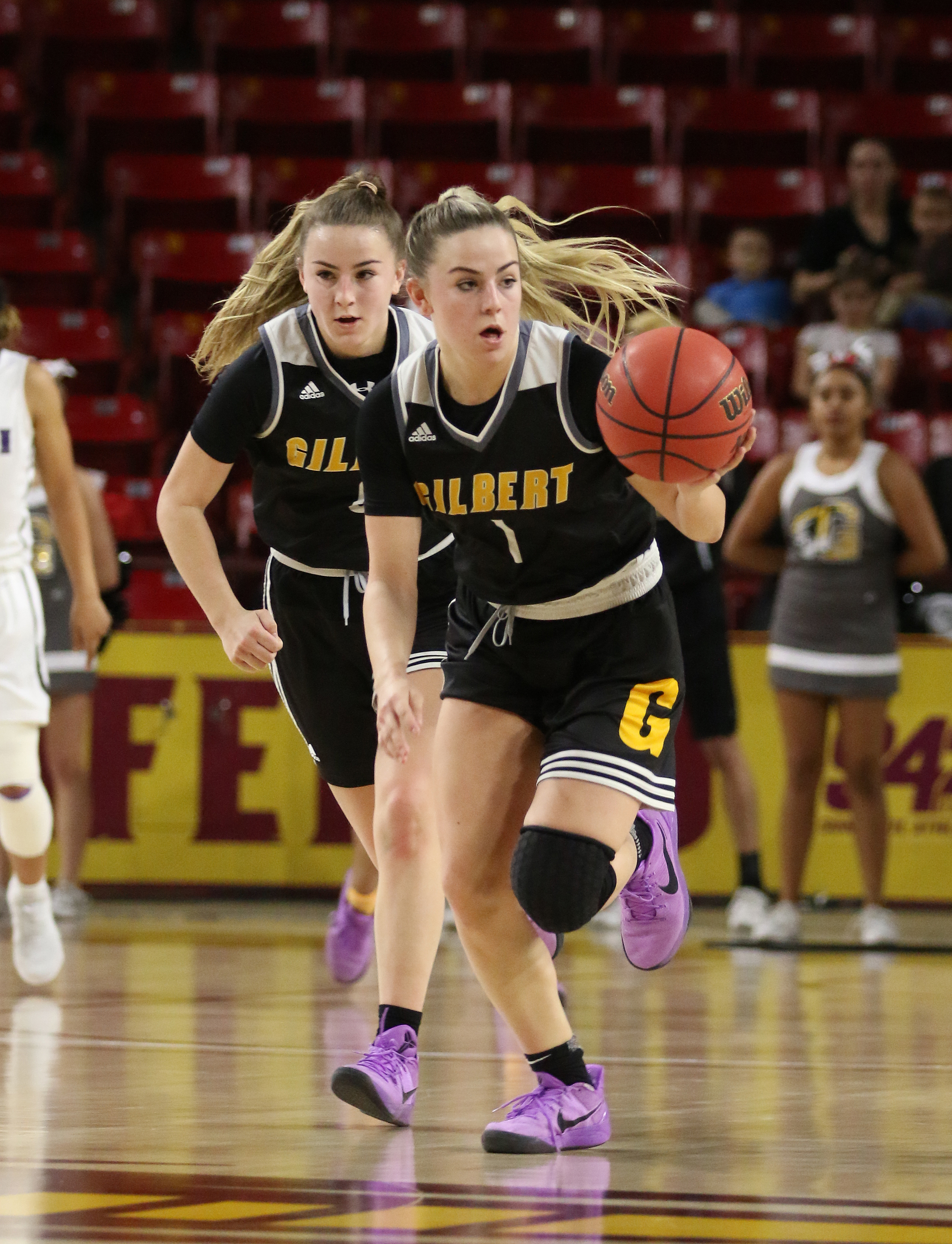
Haley Cavinder (foreground) and her twin sister Hanna (background) playing for Gilbert High School in 2018

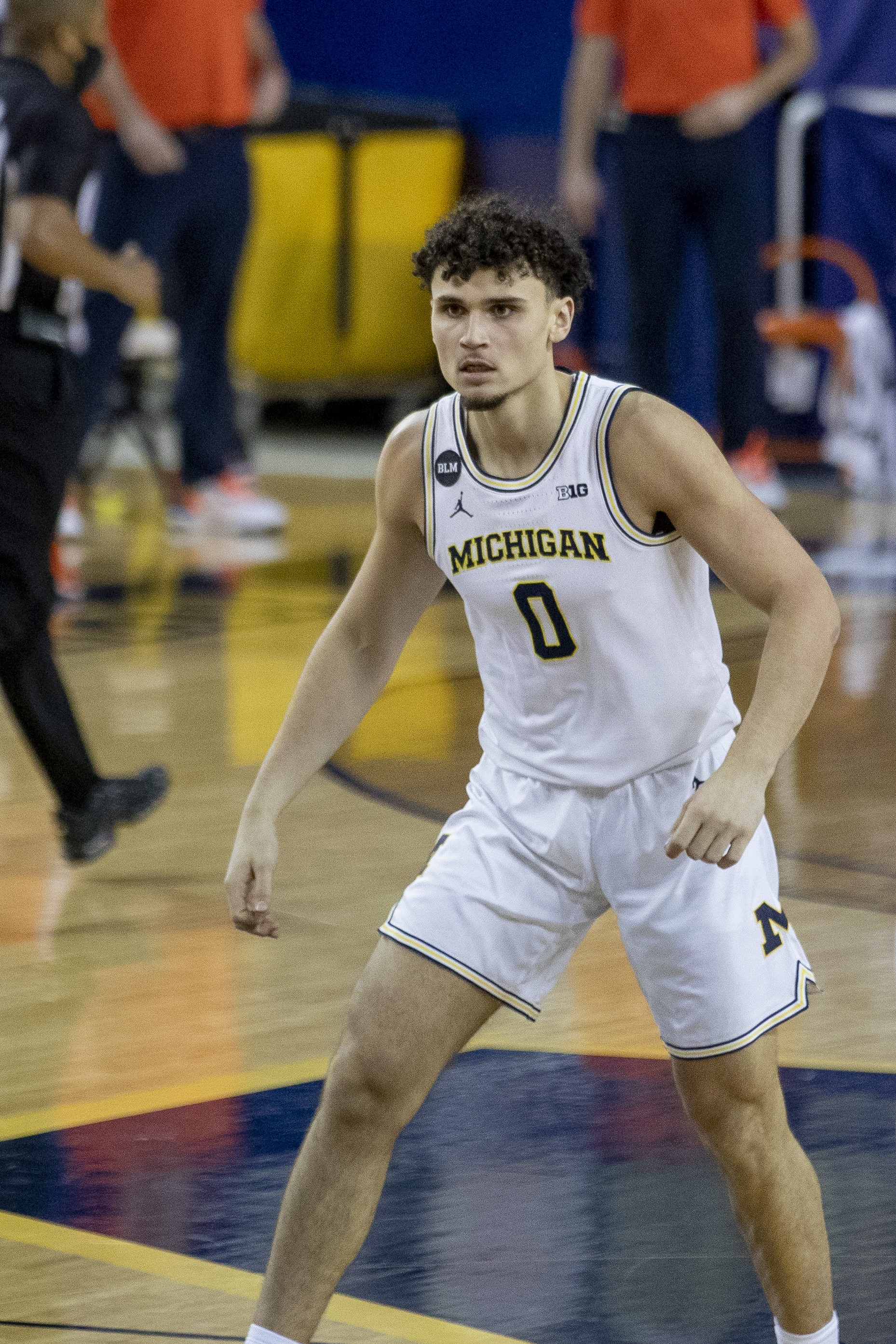
Adrien Nunez playing for the 2020–21 Michigan Wolverines in March 2021

In July 2021, athletes such as the Cavender twins and Adrien Nunez were allowed to earn income without losing their NCAA scholarships.

Following the National Collegiate Athletic Association v. Alston ruling by the Supreme Court of the United States in 2021, pre-college and college athletes became eligible for student athlete compensation for use of their personality rights without loss of athletic eligibility and education-related benefits, which broadened the influencer landscape to people who might not yet be celebrities; subsequently, it became common for amateur athletes to use the name, image and likeness of their personal brand as influencers for hire outside of the field of play.

=== LGBTQ+ ===
In countries where LGBTQ+ people are discriminated against, influencing can be an opportunity to make money through personalized content and express identities. For example, in Thailand, transgender women are less likely to receive a job and more likely to drop out of school than other Thais. These transgender women who have become influencers have reported that the job has allowed them to take control of their lives and the narratives around them. They rely on themselves and their brand and content, rather than the economic or legal systems of their country. Influencing can increase stereotypes, though, and requires resources that can be hard for marginalized communities to obtain.

=== State-sponsored ===
Some national governments have employed state-sponsored influencers to share political propaganda, content positively depicting the country, or public interest communications. China is especially prominent in sponsoring influencers, using both domestic state media reporters and foreigners who are paid to produce content. Russia has also paid influencers, sometimes unwittingly such as in the case of Tenet Media.

== Income ==
Influencers can make money in various ways, but most of them earn money from endorsements or sponsorships. Social media influencers can use their fame to promote products or experiences to their followers, as a method of providing credibility to products.

Influencers can also expand their source of revenue by creating their own products or merchandise to sell. In recent years, influencers have also begun monetizing their audiences through educational platforms such as RJPL Academy and Graphy, which allows creators to sell online courses and host live masterclasses for their followers. By doing this, and by using their platform to promote their products to an established audience, influencers can earn money by developing their own reputable brands. Bloggers can feature sponsored posts in social media to make profits. For instance, fashion blogger Chiara Ferragni started as an online blogger, and then gained millions of followers on Instagram. She later created her brand, the Chiara Ferragni Collection. Like many other Instagram celebrities, Ferragni started by charging money per post for promoting brands. She earns revenue from promotional Instagram posts and the sale of her own products. In 2020, a report by venture-capital firm SignalFire stated that the economy spawned by internet creators was the "fastest-growing type of small business".

Additionally, marginalized communities are able to pursue influencing as a profession if they live in countries where it is harder to get a job or achieve higher education because of their backgrounds.

=== Regulations ===
Despite the recent emergence of influencer culture, influencer marketing and advertising is left highly unregulated by existing legislation. This became a prevalent concern when users on social media platforms were finding it difficult to distinguish between advertisements, sponsorships and personal posts. This was evident with the mismanagement of Fyre Festival, where numerous Instagram influencers were sanctioned for their lack of transparency. This led to a massive backlash from the public, who felt the promotion of the event deliberately misled and confused target audiences. As a result, numerous advertising bodies sought to introduce strict regulations and guidelines around influencer marketing. This includes the Australian Association of National Advertisers (AANA), which states that influencer advertising must be "clearly distinguishable".

In August 2024, the Federal Trade Commission voted unanimously to ban marketers from using fake user reviews created by generative artificial intelligence chatbots (such as ChatGPT) and influencers paying for bots to increase follower counts.

=== Payments ===
Most influencers are paid before the start of a marketing campaign, and others are paid after it ends. Consensus exists about how much an influencer should be paid. Compensation may vary by how many people an influencer can reach, the extent to which they will endorse the product (a deliverable), and the success of their past endorsements have performed.

Top-tier influencers and celebrities may receive a six- or seven-figure fee for a single social-media post. In addition to (or in lieu of) a fee, payment may include free products or services. While top-tier influencers generate attention, only 4% of all influencers make more than $100,000 a year. For influencers with smaller followings, free products or services may be the only form of compensation. Advertisers are increasingly inclined to see influencers with a small but dedicated follower base as a more efficient use of marketing dollars.

Forrester Research analyst Michael Speyer notes that for small and medium-sized businesses, "IT sales are influenced by several parties, including peers, consultants, bloggers, and technology resellers." According to Speyer, "Vendors need to identify and characterize influencers inside their market. This requires a comprehensive influencer identification program and the establishment of criteria for ranking influencer impact on the decision process."

Share of Marketing Spending by Follower Count
Follower Count	Percent of total US Marketing Expenditure in 2024
>100,000	30%
20,000–100,000	25%
< 20,000	45%

== Categorization ==
Influencers are categorized by the number of followers they have on social media. They include celebrity endorsements from those with large followings, to niche content creators with a loyal following on social-media platforms such as YouTube, Instagram, Facebook, and Twitter. Their followers range in number from hundreds of millions to 1,000.

- Nano-influencers – These are influencers that have up to 10k followers.
- Micro-influencers – These are influencers that have 10k to 100k followers.
- Macro-influencers – These are influencers that have 100k to 500k followers.
- Mega/Celeb-influencers – These are the influencers with more than 500k followers.

Categorization by the monetization model of an influencer’s activities (J. Kotarbiński’s categorization):

- Influencer 1.0 is a creator who primarily functions as a vehicle for one-off (or short-term) promotional messages on social media. In this model, cooperation with a brand may be limited to a single publication (e.g., a sponsored post), and its effects are assessed mainly through simple metrics (likes, comments, shares). Compensation is usually agreed in advance and tied primarily to follower scale, with less emphasis on deeper engagement, message personalization, or a long-term relationship with the brand.
- Influencer 2.0 is a creator who goes beyond the promoter role and, in addition to advertising brands, actively co-creates products and develops their activity in an entrepreneurial direction, often transforming a personal brand into a more complex market venture. This model more often relies on long-term, partnership-based collaboration with brands rather than solely on one-off advertising exposures.
- Influencer 3.0 is a creator combining creativity, entrepreneurship, and advanced technologies, whose activity is aimed at building multi-dimensional relationships with the community and scaling beyond the classic confines of social media platforms. In this view, Influencers 3.0 not only develop their own personal brands and co-create products, but also create more “immersive” experiences and use technology as a significant component of their activity.

Businesses pursue people who aim to lessen their consumption of advertisements, and are willing to pay their influencers more. Targeting influencers is seen as increasing marketing's reach, counteracting a growing tendency by prospective customers to ignore marketing.

Marketing researchers Kapitan and Silvera find that influencer selection extends into product personality. This product and benefit matching is key. For a shampoo, it should use an influencer with good hair. Likewise, a flashy product may use bold colors to convey its brand. If an influencer is not flashy, they will clash with the brand. Matching an influencer with the product's purpose and mood is important.

== Influencer as an entrepreneur ==
According to J. Kotarbiński, an influencer can be described as an entrepreneur who monetizes their personal brand across several categories of business activity:

- 'Influencer as a personal brand. A model in which the basis of an influencer’s market activity is their personal brand, understood as the way the creator is perceived by their community. In this formula, monetization results, among other things, from advertising and collaborations with brands, content monetization (e.g., paid materials, subscriptions, webinars, premium content), and the implementation of the influencer’s own ventures (e.g., marketing projects and events).
- 'Influencer as a strategic brand ambassador. A cooperation model in which an influencer integrates their personal brand with external brands, creating value for both parties through various forms of collaboration. Typical activities include, among others, product placement, a long-term role as a brand ambassador, and participation in multi-channel advertising campaigns.
- 'Personal Private Label (PPL). A business model in which an influencer creates and manages their own product brands, basing their development on the equity of the personal brand. Kotarbiński defines PPL as a formula that provides the influencer with independence in design, production, distribution, and promotion, as well as the possibility of expanding the offering across different types: physical brands, semi-digital brands, digital brands, and services.

== Controversies and problems ==
=== Legal controversies ===
In 2015, influencer Kim Kardashian reviewed the pregnancy sickness drug Diclegis, which she had promoted after entering a partnership with Merrill Dow Pharmaceuticals. The FDA flagged the post and then ordered her to take it down and repost it listing the drug's known side effects.

By the mid-2020s, controversies surrounding influencers had expanded beyond undisclosed pharmaceutical endorsements to include hidden advertising and the promotion of regulated financial products. In 2026, the Australian Competition and Consumer Commission (ACCC) fined PhotobookShop A$39,600 after alleging that it posted misleading influencer reviews on Instagram, including by failing to disclose that influencers had been compensated and by editing one review to remove negative comments.

In another 2026 case, the United Kingdom's Financial Conduct Authority said that seven social media influencers were sentenced for issuing unauthorised financial promotions related to a foreign exchange trading scheme, reflecting increasing regulatory scrutiny of so-called "influencers".

=== Health problems ===
Influencers can develop social media fatigue, harming their physical health. This can include decreased sleep, headaches, eye strain, and skeletal and muscular issues. Due to these effects, influencers can lose motivation and begin to find less value and meaning from their work.

=== Oversaturation ===
In a 2024 survey, 57% of Gen Z said that they would like to be a social media influencer. Another 53% considered it a credible career pathway. However, social media influencing as a career is extremely volatile. Half of all social media influencers make less than $15k a year, while only 4% of social media influencers make more than $100k a year. The situation is expected to worsen with the rise of artificial intelligence. Many influencers in the 2020s are expected to engage with more narrow audiences than influencers before as businesses seek influencers with more niche interests for advertising. This has drawn more money to hobbyists, but not enough to go full-time.

== See also ==
- Celebrity culture
- Online streamer
- Opinion leadership
- Social media marketing
- independent media
