= Neely Traditional Academy =

- 500 E Houston Ave Gilbert, AZ 85234

Information
- School type: Elementary School/Traditional Academy
- Established: 1981
- School district: Gilbert Public Schools
- Principal: Jennifer Greene
- Grades: PreK-6th
- National ranking: Ranked #4 among Arizona's Elementary Schools
- Website: https://neelytraditionalacademy.gilbertschools.net/

Neely Traditional Academy was founded in 1999 in Gilbert, Arizona, and is part of Gilbert Public Schools. The school was originally opened in 1981 as a non-traditional elementary school before becoming a traditional academy in 1999.

== Overview ==
Neely Traditional Academy was the first traditional Academy (grade K-6) in the East Valley.

For the 2023-24 school year Neely received an "A" school grade from the Arizona Department of Education and achieved an A+ School of Excellence award from the Arizona Education Foundation in 2023.

In 2024, Neely Traditional Academy was ranked #4 among Arizona's elementary schools. U.S. News & World Report compiles standardized scores for each school it evaluates based on four ranking indicators, in order to ensure rankings are fair for schools across the United States. The ranking indicators include proficiency and performance in both mathematics and reading. Data is collected from public sources provided by the U.S. Department of Education. "83% of students scored at or above the proficient level for math, and 86% scored at or above the proficiency level for reading. These scores, along with a reading and math performance that far exceeded expectations, earned Neely Traditional Academy an overall score of 99.71 out of 100."

Neely received the National Blue Ribbon School award in 2009 and 2023.
