= Hanna Cavinder =

American social media personality and former basketball player (born 2001)

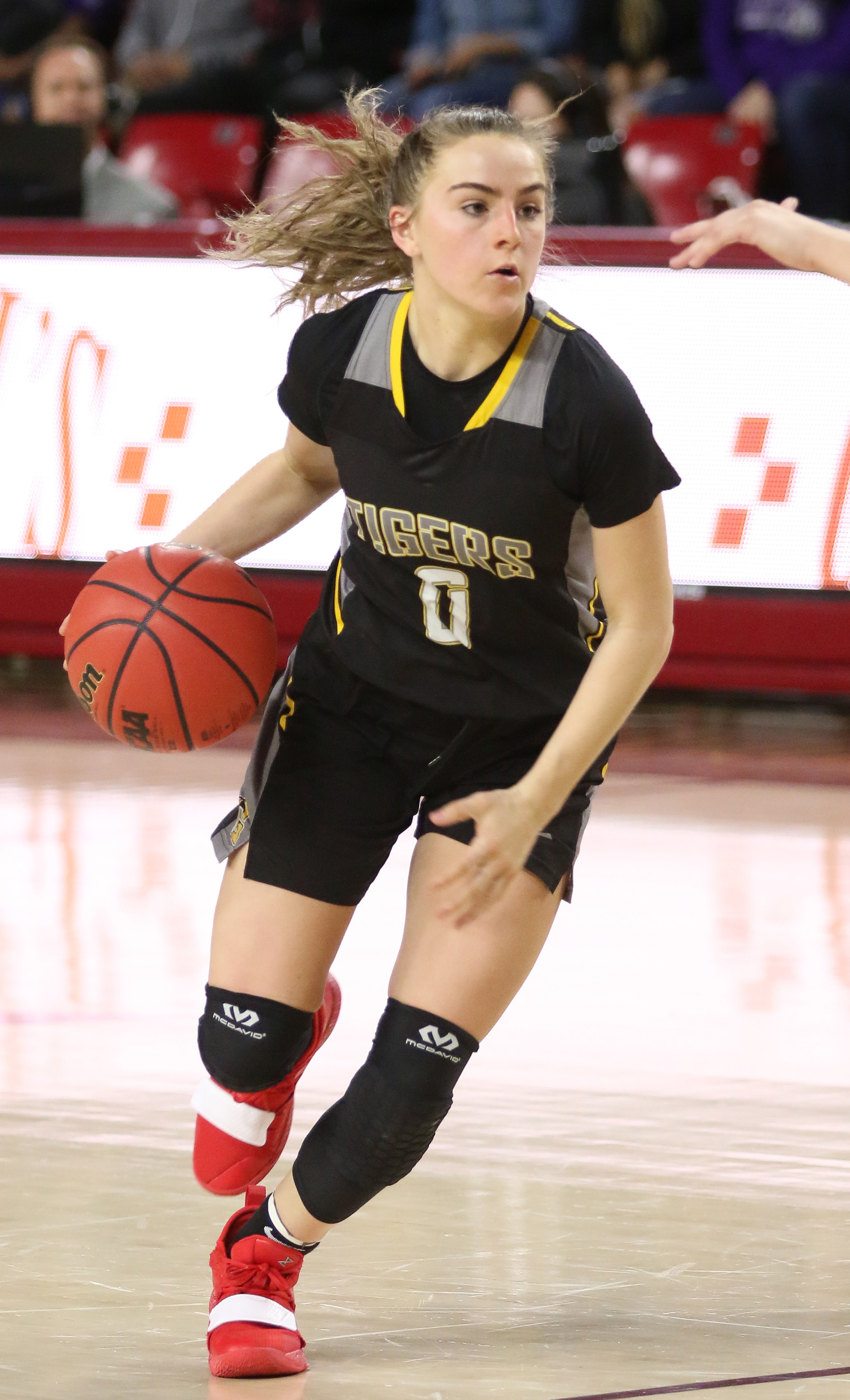
- Cavinder with Gilbert High School in 2019
- Basketball career

Personal information
- Born: January 13, 2001 (age 25) South Bend, Indiana, U.S.
- Listed height: 5 ft 6 in (1.68 m)

Career information
- High school: Gilbert (Gilbert, Arizona)
- College: Fresno State (2019–2022); Miami (FL) (2022–2023; 2024–2025)
- Position: Guard
- Number: 14

Career highlights
- 2× All-Mountain West Team (2020, 2021); Mountain West All-Freshman Team (2020)

Instagram information
- Page: cavindertwins
- Followers: 453 thousand

TikTok information
- Page: cavindertwins
- Followers: 4.5 million
- Last updated: May 24, 2026

Hanna Cavinder (born January 13, 2001) is an American social media influencer and former college basketball player for the Miami Hurricanes of the Atlantic Coast Conference (ACC). She began her college career at Fresno State, where she was a two-time All-Mountain West Conference (MWC) selection and a MWC All-Freshman Team selection. Prior to collegiate basketball she was the Arizona 5A Offensive Player of the Year as a senior for Gilbert High School where she played with her fraternal twin, Haley, and elder sister Brandi.

Cavinder and her fraternal twin and teammate, Haley, have a large social media following and share social media accounts on platforms such as TikTok where they have millions of followers. They are leading figures in college sports endorsements, signing name, image and likeness (NIL) deals with several companies, including Boost Mobile and WWE, and co-founding the clothing company Baseline Team.

== Early life ==
Cavinder was born in South Bend, Indiana, on January 13, 2001, one minute after and one pound (454 g) lighter than her twin sister, Haley. The family moved to the Phoenix area by the twins' age 3. The twins often opted for basketball time in the driveway instead of Sesame Street time before going to preschool, even though they had no hoop assembly and just did YouTube drills. They tried many sports in their early years before focusing on basketball and emulating Skylar Diggins-Smith in junior high. The twins were adventurous athletes from a young age and competed against boys in basketball until sixth grade. When they joined a girls' team in middle school, they competed with and against girls a few years older. In club basketball, they participated in 15–17 age competition as sixth graders. They got their first scholarship offers before their freshman season from San Diego.

== High School ==
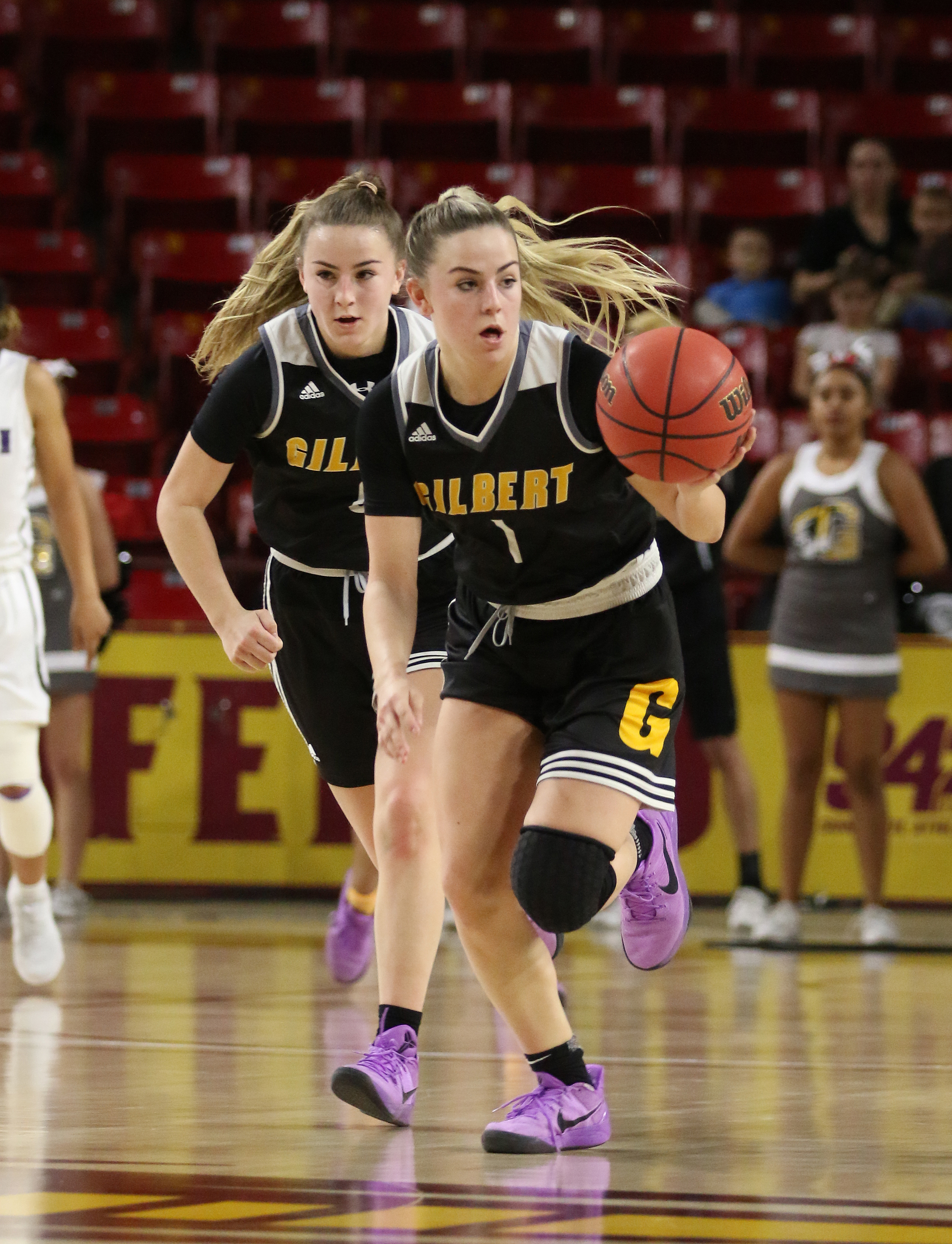
Hanna (left rear) trailing her sister Haley in 2018

Gilbert High School had not had much recent success. From 2010–11 to 2013–14, Gilbert won single digit games. The 2014–15 team went 13–15 and won its first round playoff game (as a 21 seed). With the twins as the leading scorers each season, Gilbert had winning records and reached at least the state quarterfinals each of the first three seasons.

When the twins entered Gilbert as freshmen in 2015, elder sister Brandi transferred to join them as a junior after previously being basketball teammates with eldest sister Brooke at Campo Verde. While Hanna (14.5 ppg) and Haley (13 ppg) were the mid-season scoring leaders on the team, Brandi was a role player who played every game, but only averaged 1.7 ppg. The pregame Gilbert starting lineup announcement was presented in numerical order as follows: "At guard, No. 0, a 5-6 freshman, Hanna Cavinder...At guard, No. 1, a 5-6 freshman, Haley Cavinder...At forward, No. 2, a 5-5 junior, Brandi Cavinder..." A December 8, 2015, 56–53 loss to Millennium High School dropped Gilbert to a 4–5 record. Then, a players-only 2-hour meeting sparked a 12–5 stretch and a 16–10 record by mid February. Hamilton High School eliminated Gilbert in the 2016 Division I quarterfinals. Gilbert was eliminated by Millennium in the 2017 state semifinals.

Gilbert lost the 2018 class 6A state semifinal to Valley Vista High School. They finished with a 26–4 record. As a junior, she received an honorable mention when the 2018 American Family Insurance All-USA Arizona High School Girls Basketball Player of the Year finalists (including her sister) were named. Hanna was considering attending Boston University, San Diego, Loyola Marymount, and Santa Clara before signing with Fresno State. The twins sacrificed their junior and senior proms for club basketball activities.

Although she entered her 2018–19 senior season as an American Family Insurance All-USA Arizona preseason girls basketball team selection along with her sister, Haley, her role was to drive and score so as to keep teams from double teaming her sister. Hanna played point guard and shooting guard interchangeably with twin Haley. As a senior, Cavinder contributed to an explosive Gilbert offense and defense that had a half dozen 50+-point margins of victory before mid-January, including a 96–2 victory over Betty H. Fairfax High School. In a December 14, 2018, 50–44 loss to number-one-ranked (among Class 5A in AZ) Millennium High School, Hanna was held to a season-low 4 points. In the February 18, 2019, class 5A girls 68–52 semifinal victory against Horizon High School, Hanna contributed 17 points, 8 rebounds and 6 assists. In the 2019 class 5A girls state-championship game rematch loss to Millennium, Hanna led Gilbert in 13 points, 5 rebounds and 5 assists. According to the East Valley Tribune, following the game, Cavinder's career point total of 2,179 was within 100 of her sister's. Gilbert finished the season 25–6.

== College ==
Cavinder's 23-point, 5-assist, 5-steal, 4-rebound debut performance against Cal Poly set a Fresno State record for most points in a freshman debut. As a freshman for Fresno State, she twice earned Mountain West Conference Player of the Week (December 16, 2019, and February 17, 2020). She started her college career with a 12-game double-digit scoring streak, but the streak came to an end when she posted 9 points, 9 assists, 6 steals, and 4 rebounds on December 28, 2019, against UC Merced. On February 12, 2020, against San Jose State, Cavinder contributed 20 points and 5 assists to help Fresno State (21–4, 14–0) clinch a share of the 2019–20 Mountain West Conference regular season championship. On February 15, 2020, against Utah State, Cavinder contributed a team-high 20 points as well as 4 steals and 3 assists to help Fresno State (22–4, 15–0) clinch the outright 2019–20 Mountain West Conference regular season championship. On February 19 against Air Force, both twins surpassed the school freshman-season scoring record set by Jalessa Ross (421). 15 points for Hanna brought her total to 427, 9 behind her twin sister. She went on to earn Mountain West Conference All-Freshman Team and All-Conference Team recognition. Despite 17 points from each twin, Fresno State lost to Boise State in overtime in the championship game of the 2020 Mountain West Conference women's basketball tournament, earning an automatic bid to the 2020 Women's National Invitation Tournament (NIT) after being passed over for the 2020 NCAA Division I women's basketball tournament. However, on March 12, the NCAA announced that the NIT was canceled due to the COVID-19 pandemic.

As a sophomore for Fresno State, Cavinder earned Mountain West Conference Player of the Week on February 15, 2021. On February 27, 2021, Cavinder posted her career-high 32 points against UNLV in a 75–74 Senior night loss. She again earned Mountain West Conference All-Conference Team recognition. In the 2021 Mountain West Conference women's basketball tournament semifinal upset victory against top-seeded New Mexico, Cavinder had 13 points, 7 assists, 5 rebounds, and 4 steals. Despite being the higher seed and 12 points from Cavinder, Fresno State again lost in the Mountain West Tournament championship game, this time to Wyoming. The team earned an at-large bid to the 2021 Women's National Invitation Tournament. Cavinder led the Mountain West Conference in field goal percentage (191/412=46.4%).

Although she was a Preseason All-Conference Team selection as a junior, she was not an All-Conference team honoree following the season. She finished 10th in the Mountain West in scoring (14.6) and 15th in the NCAA in minutes played (37.1). After two seasons ending at Women's National Invitation Tournaments, Cavinder's third year concluded on March with an 11–18 record. On Monday March 14, 2022, the twins entered the NCAA transfer portal. Eventually, they visited Arizona State, Miami and USC. Part of their motivation for entering the portal was to find a basketball program that would increase their chances of being able to experience the NCAA Division I women's basketball tournament version of March Madness.

On April 21, 2022, the twins announced their intent to transfer from Fresno State to University of Miami. Upon their arrival at the University of Miami, they became the most followed athletes to have played basketball for the school with over 5 million social media followers. The transfer to the Coral Gables, Florida, school brought the twins to within an hour of Nova Southeastern University in Davie, Florida, where their father played basketball from 1992 to 1994. The transfer also put them closer to paternal grandparents in Naples, Florida, and a sister in St. Petersburg, Florida.

After transferring, the NCAA sanctioned the University of Miami for "impermissible contact", "inducement", and "head-coach responsibility" violations due to social media publicity surrounding a recruiting dinner with a booster earlier that April when its governing body issued its first NIL infractions ruling, prompting a social media retort by the twins. Although neither twin was directly punished, Miami head coach Katie Meier received a three-game suspension and the university was subject to numerous penalties.

During her senior season in Miami, Cavinder's top output was 15 points on senior night on 5–7 three point shooting in an 85–74 victory over Virginia in the 2022–23 ACC regular season finale. Cavinder earned All-ACC academic recognition and was projected to be on the Dean's list as an anthropology major. In the 2023 NCAA Division I women's basketball tournament, Cavinder got to enjoy a run to the elite eight. Miami had a 17-point rally against Oklahoma State, followed by victories over #1-seeded Indiana, and Villanova, before falling to the Angel Reese–led, eventual champion, number-3 seeded LSU Tigers team.

Cavinder had another year of athletic eligibility because the NCAA did not count the 2020–21 season that had been extensively disrupted by COVID-19 against the eligibility of any basketball player. Nonetheless, on April 11, 2023, she decided to forgo her final year of athletic eligibility to pursue other business ventures with her twin sister. When they were interviewed on The Today Show in the subsequent days, they emphasized that outside opportunities such as the WWE were a better decision for them. On April 17, 2024, she and her sister decided to return to Miami for their final year of eligibility.

== Career statistics ==
Legend
GP	Games played	GS	Games started	MPG	Minutes per game	RPG	Rebounds per game
APG	Assists per game	SPG	Steals per game	BPG	Blocks per game	PPG	Points per game
TO	Turnovers per game	FG%	Field-goal percentage	3P%	3-point field-goal percentage	FT%	Free-throw percentage
**Bold**	Career best	°	League leader

=== College ===
Year	Team	GP	GS	MPG	FG%	3P%	FT%	RPG	APG	SPG	BPG	TO	PPG
2019–20	Fresno State	32	**31**	35.1	43.5	21.4	82.3	2.5	3.7	**1.8**	**0.1**	2.5	15.7
2020–21	Fresno State	28	27	35.1	**46.4**	29.9	69.7	3.6	3.9	**1.8**	**0.1**	2.7	**17.0**
2021–22	Fresno State	29	29	**37.0**	39.2	**36.2**	80.5	**3.8**	3.7	**1.8**	**0.1**	2.6	14.6
2022–23	Miami (FL)	**34**	0	16.7	36.8	30.7	**82.6**	1.3	1.6	0.6	0.0	**0.7**	3.8
2024–25	Miami (FL)	29	29	32.8	**46.4**	26.0	76.5	3.2	**4.2**	0.8	**0.1**	2.8	6.9
**Career**		152	116	30.9	43.0	29.0	78.2	2.8	3.4	1.3	0.1	2.2	11.4
Statistics retrieved from Sports-Reference.

== Professional career ==
Prior to July 1, 2021, the Cavinder twins had to guard their athletic eligibility by declining merchandise, endorsements and collaborations with monetary value and ensuring that they were never compensated for YouTube videos. Meanwhile, their classmates and student peers across the nation who were not NCAA competitors, such as models and musicians, were allowed to profit freely off of their NIL in the modern social media landscape. The twins became the face of the NIL movement. The brand value that they were forgoing to remain eligible for NCAA competition was in excess of $500,000. On the eve of the NIL, the Cavinder twins still had no clarity on where social media would take them. In 2021, the twins hired their eldest sister Brooke to manage their business and hired a lawyer to assist in their business ventures. July 1, 2021 was the first day college athletes were finally able to profit from their name, image, and likeness (NIL) rights by signing third-party sponsorship agreements. On that day, within hours having passed from the rule change, the Cavinder Twins signed an NIL deal with Boost Mobile which was advertised in Times Square. In addition to Boost, the Twins signed with Six Star Pro Nutrition just after midnight. According to The Guardian, they are regarded as "the first college athletes to legally sign a major endorsement deal under the NCAA's new name, image and likeness (NIL) regulations".

By the end of the first week in the new NIL landscape, they had a third endorsement for Gopuff. In December, Cavinder was one of 15 athletes to sign with the WWE in the inaugural class of athletes to benefit from the NIL changes. The deal was reported as a six-figure deal that requires both social media engagement and physical appearance. In January 2022, as part of their ninth NIL business partnership, the Cavinders announced they had acquired ownership and board rights in a sportswear company founded by other Fresno State athletes. By the anniversary of the rule changes the twins had grossed over $1 million in endorsements and partnerships according to their agent and approximately $1.7 million before taxes and fees according to a Forbes estimate.

As women's basketball players the twins are considered proof that NIL benefits go beyond the "biggest names in the biggest sports". They show the NIL business possibilities for both female and non-revenue sport athletes. Cavinder noted that "We don't go to the Power Five school. We're not the quarterback."

== Social media ==
Cavinder enrolled at Fresno State in 2019 and the end of her freshman year coincided with the COVID-19 lockdowns that sent her home to finish the school year and quarantine with her family. On March 23, Hanna got Haley to do dribble beats with some audio input. The resulting videos surpassed 2 million views. During the 2020 summer of the COVID-19 pandemic in the United States, Hanna initiated a social media dance video post with Haley. As they began to post, they soon had their first viral video, a TikTok synchronous video of them dribbling to "The Chicken Wing Beat", which got tens of millions of views. Although social media activity was originally just a hobby, their joint videos grew their number of followers into the millions and Cavinder credits Opendorse with educating her as to the value of the brand that she created. At the time of the July 1, 2023, NIL changes, the Cavinder twins had 3.3 million TikTok and 515,000 Instagram followers. Despite the fact that they are skilled athletes, their NIL value stems from their social media influence, which is in part due to their ability to deliver what both brands and their social media audience demand. Cavinder believes that twins are particularly marketable stating "I just think people really like twins". In December 2024, the twins were named to the Forbes 30 Under 30 list for their social media leadership.

== Personal life ==
Hanna has four sisters: eldest sister Brooke, next oldest Brandi, twin Haley, and younger sister Natalie. Brandi was two classes ahead of the twins in high school and Natalie was one behind. Her height is 5 ft 6 in.

Between 2024 and 2025, Cavinder was in a relationship with Georgia Bulldogs and Miami Hurricanes quarterback Carson Beck. On February 20, 2025, Beck and Cavinder's luxury cars were stolen as part of a home burglary.
