= Highland High School (Arizona) =

Public high school located in Gilbert, Arizona

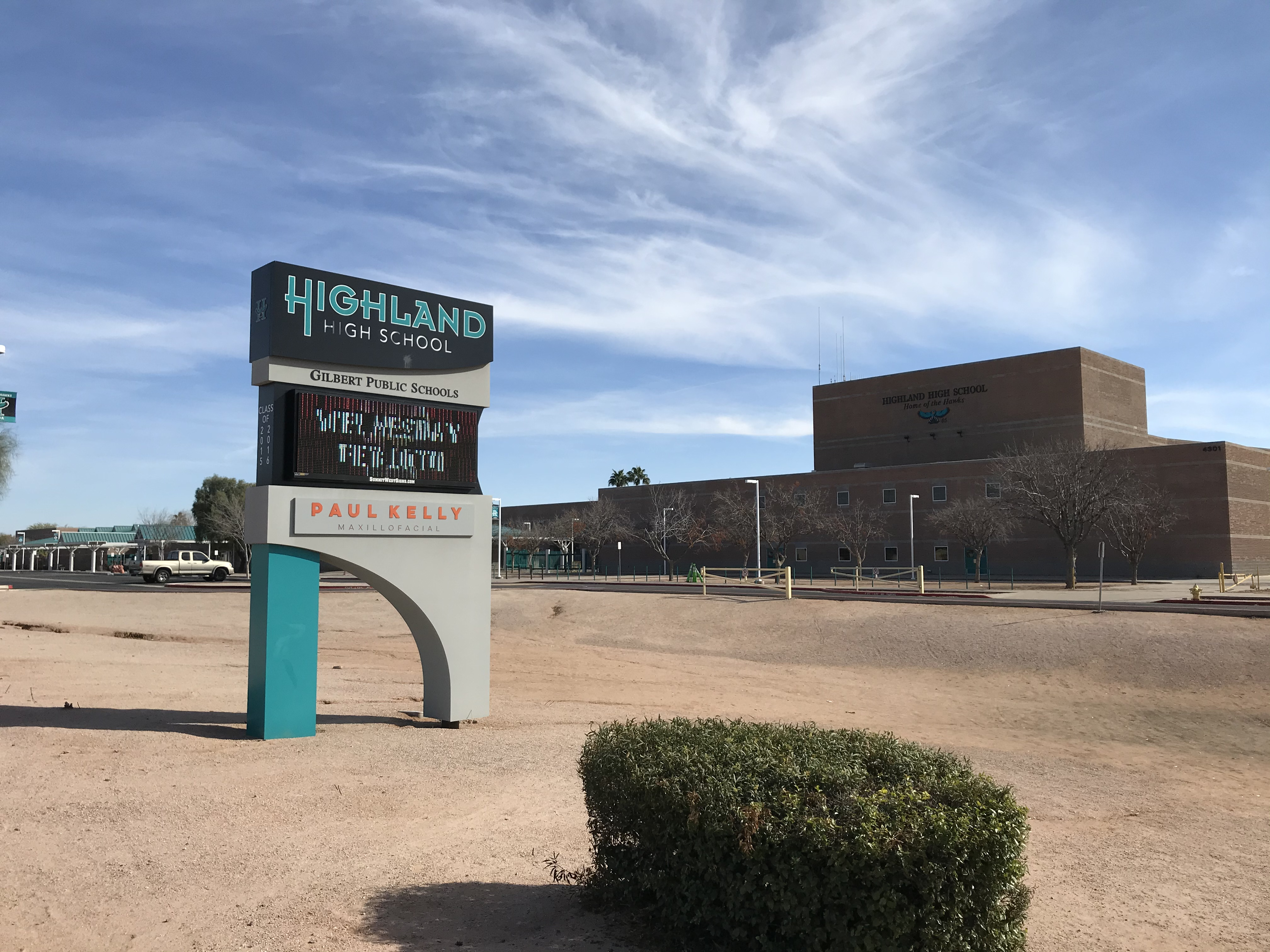
- Home of the Hawks

Location
- 4301 E. Guadalupe Rd. Gilbert, Arizona, Maricopa, Arizona 85234; United States; 33°21′49″N 111°41′53″W

Information
- Type: Public High school
- Motto: R.I.S.E. Above
- Established: 1993
- School district: Gilbert Public Schools
- Principal: Brian Yee
- Teaching staff: 146.20 (FTE)
- Grades: 9–12
- Enrollment: 3,027 (2023–2024)
- Student to teacher ratio: 20.70
- Campus type: Suburban
- Colors: Black and teal
- Athletics conference: 6A - Central, Division I
- Mascot: Hawks
- Rival: Gilbert High School
- Yearbook: Talon
- Website: https://highlandhigh.gilbertschools.net/

Highland High School (HHS) is a public high school located in Gilbert, Arizona, United States. It was built in 1992 and is part of the Gilbert Public Schools district. It accommodates grades 9–12, and in 2010, the school had a student body of 2,957.

In athletics, the school is known collectively as the Highland Hawks. Highland is a member of the Arizona Interscholastic Association's 6A Conference and competes in Division I in all AIA sports.

For the 2023-24 school year Highland High School received an "A" school grade from the Arizona Department of Education.

Highland High is also an A+ School of Excellence as designated by the Arizona Education Foundation for the school years of 2020-2024.

== Campus ==
Highland High School is located at 4301 E. Guadalupe Road in Gilbert, Arizona, on the south side of Guadalupe between Recker Road and Power Road. Its campus includes a two-story main building, and six other buildings for athletics, administration, electives, the commons, and the performing arts. It has a gymnasium, three baseball diamonds, a football field, a marching band practice field, a softball field, and two soccer fields. The school features a student-run convenience store, the Spirit Store, which also sells Highland branded merchandise. An on-campus cafeteria offers school meal options as well as pizza from Dominos. The library was removed due to lack of funding by the school board.

== Academics ==
Highland's academic offers are organized under 12 departments: Agriculture, Business, English, Family & Consumer Science, Fine & Performing Arts, Industrial Arts, Math, Modern Language, Physical Education/Education for the body, Science, Social Studies, and Special Education.

Highland students may elect to participate in Advanced Placement courses, Career & Technical Education (CTE) courses, and Dual Enrollment courses with Maricopa Community Colleges.

Students who maintain at least a 3.8 GPA during the first three grading quarters are recognized as Golden Scholars at a ceremony at the end of each year. Graduation from Highland entails a baccalaureate service and a commencement ceremony.

In 2004, Highland was honored as a Blue Ribbon school.

== Student life ==
Highland hosts more than 70 activities and student clubs. The school has participated in FIRST Robotics Competition either as a stand-alone entity or in partnership with other schools or universities. It won the AZ Regional FRC Competition in 2007, 2008, 2009. It won LA Vegas FRC in 2008. It won the AZ regional FTC competition in 2011 and 2012. It took first place in 2009 and 2010 at the university level at NURC in cooperation with teammates from Arizona State University. It won the Sparkfun AVC (Autonomous Vehicle Challenge) competition in 2012.

The school's Future Farmers of America (FFA) Chapter won first in state for its ag sales team in 2007.

Other groups at Highland include contingents for Academic Decathlon.

Dances sponsored by the school are Homecoming, Winter Formal, and Prom.

Twenty-three percent of HHS students participate in a daily, release-time seminary program operated by the Church of Jesus Christ of Latter-day Saints, which has a religious instruction building adjacent to campus.

=== Athletics ===
Highland High School's Football stadium used for home games.

Highland is known collectively as the Highland Hawks in athletic competition and has won several team and individual state titles.

State championships for the Hawks in sports include the following:

- Boys' basketball: 2023
- Girls' basketball: 1994, 1995, 2003, 2005, 2008, 2009
- Girls' cross country: 2021
- Boys' cross country: 2011, 2019
- Boys' croquet: 2003, 2010
- Boys' soccer: 2007, 2009
- Girls' soccer: 2012, 2015
- Boys' volleyball: 2004, 2005, 2013
- Wrestling: 2001, 2005, 2009
- Varsity Football: 2021, 2022
- Girls Track: 2023

=== Performing arts ===
Highland High Schools's Band performing at a school event in 2026

Highland's band program has an enrollment of over 300 students in three year-round concert bands, three year-round jazz bands, two spring woodwind choirs, and a competitive marching band. The marching band has received national recognition, and has marched in the Fiesta Bowl Parade (1999), the Disneyland Light Parade (2000), the Tournament of Roses Parade (2001), the Macy's Thanksgiving Day Parade (2004) and the 2021 Pearl Harbor Memorial Parade in Waikiki commemorating the 80th anniversary of the bombings. It ranked #4 in the Fiesta Bowl National Band Championship Competition in 1999 and in 2009. In addition, the Highland Marching Band has been in the top division(s) in the State of Arizona for over 28 consecutive years and consistently qualify for state championships. Furthermore, they are two time state champions with being the first band to ever win the ABODA Division 1 State Marching Band Championship in 2009 and the AzMBA 4A State Championship in 2016.

Uniquely, The Jazz Program hosts a yearly Highland/ASU Jazz Festival for the past 11 years and has the only United Sound Jazz Band Program in the United States. Accolades from the Highland jazz program includes the 2010 and 2017 Judge’s Most Outstanding (Jazz Black), and the 2013, 2015 AMEA State In-Service Performance (Jazz Black).

The Concert Choir traveled to New York City in March 2007 to perform at Carnegie Hall under the direction of then Mormon Tabernacle Choir director Craig Jessop. Previously, it performed at Chicago's Orchestra Hall and at the MENC National Conference in 1998.

Highland High School orchestra rehearsing the national anthem of the United States in front of the performing arts building.

Highland's orchestra also performed at Carnegie Hall (2002), and its Symphonic Orchestra performed at the Midwest Clinic in Chicago in 1997, 2007, 2013 and most recently in 2021. The orchestra program currently has over 250 enrolled students and five performing groups. The Highland orchestra has also been a participating program in the nationwide program United Sound since United Sound first started with five schools in 2014.

In 2023 the theatre program performed Disney's Frozen: The Broadway Musical. This performance was made possible by winning the rights to perform the production through the United States of Frozen nationwide competition, in which one school in each state was awarded the privilege to be the first school in their state to perform the musical.

== Controversies ==
In the early to mid 2000's, several Highland High athletes were found to be a part of a local white supremacy gang called the Devil Dogs. The group was founded by Highland Student Michael Papa and quickly grew in numbers in the local community. The group was responsible for a 1999 beating in which five members were convicted of the crime. In later years of the gang, Papa became acquaintances with Salvatore “Sammy the Bull” Gravano, a notorious mob hit man who was allegedly responsible for the murders of 14 in New York. The pair was arrested and were charged with drug related charges. The group was later disbanded.

In 2020 a picture surfaced of the High Schools MAGA Club posing with racist gestures.

== Alumni ==
- Austin Ainge '00, President of the Utah Jazz
- Marquis Cooper '00, former NFL linebacker
- Ryan Fitzpatrick '01, former NFL quarterback
- Spencer Larsen '02, former NFL fullback/linebacker
- Shane Loux '98, former MLB relief pitcher
- Austin McNamara '19, professional football punter for the New York Jets
- Alex Naddour '09, U.S. Olympic medalist in gymnastics
- Matt Pagnozzi '01, former MLB catcher
- James Pazos '09, MLB pitcher
- Brynn Rumfallo, reality television show cast member and model
- Chaz Schilens '03, former NFL wide receiver
- Caleb Lomu, ‘23 2026 first round draft pick for the New England Patriots
