= Gilbert Classical Academy =

Coordinates: 33°22′07″N 111°46′59″W

Location
- 1016 North Burk Street Gilbert, AZ 85234; Gilbert, Arizona

Information
- Type: Public school of choice
- Motto: Aude Sapere (Dare to know)
- Established: 2007
- Principal: Elyse Torbert
- Teaching staff: 31.80 (FTE)
- Grades: 7–12
- Enrollment: 596 (2022-2023)
- Student to teacher ratio: 18.74
- Colors: Purple and gold
- Mascot: Sparty Spartan
- Website: https://gilbertclassicalacademy.gilbertschools.net/

Gilbert Classical Academy (GCA) is a choice 7th-12th junior high and high school in the Gilbert Public Schools district. It opened in 2007, replacing the former Tech and Leadership Academy in that district which served 9th–12th grades.

For the 2023-24 school year Gilbert Classical Academy received an "A" school grade from the Arizona Department of Education.

== Overview ==
Students follow a strict dress code. Uniform options for bottoms include: tan khaki shorts, pants, and white and black plaid skirts. Options for tops are limited, as students are only allowed to wear white, purple, or yellow collared shirts, such as polos or dress shirts. Seniors are permitted to wear black polos or dress shirts. Students may also wear sweaters and jackets according to the same color code. Jackets may not have a large logo on the chest. On Fridays, seniors and teachers are encouraged to wear college shirts.

Students in grades 9 through 12 are able to participate in some Arizona Interscholastic Association-sanctioned sports. Gilbert Classical Academy had its first graduating class in 2011. In 2017 the school created a program for Special Ed students.

In 2017, the school took over the campus of the Gilbert Jr High School.

This school has been ranked third in the state and tenth in the nation.

In 2018, the school was awarded the honor of being a Blue Ribbon School.

== Curriculum and traditions ==
Courses at Gilbert Classical Academy employ the Socratic method of instruction, and all courses are entirely honors or Advanced Placement courses.

Each student has the option to receive a district-issued Chromebook that facilitates the integration of technology into the curriculum. District-issued computers are monitored with the use of GoGuardian and used to issue standardized testing.

GCA employs some 65 faculty members (including 31 teachers) as of August 2024. The school was created by its founding principal, Mr. Brian Rosta.
