= Haley Cavinder =

American social media personality (born 2001)

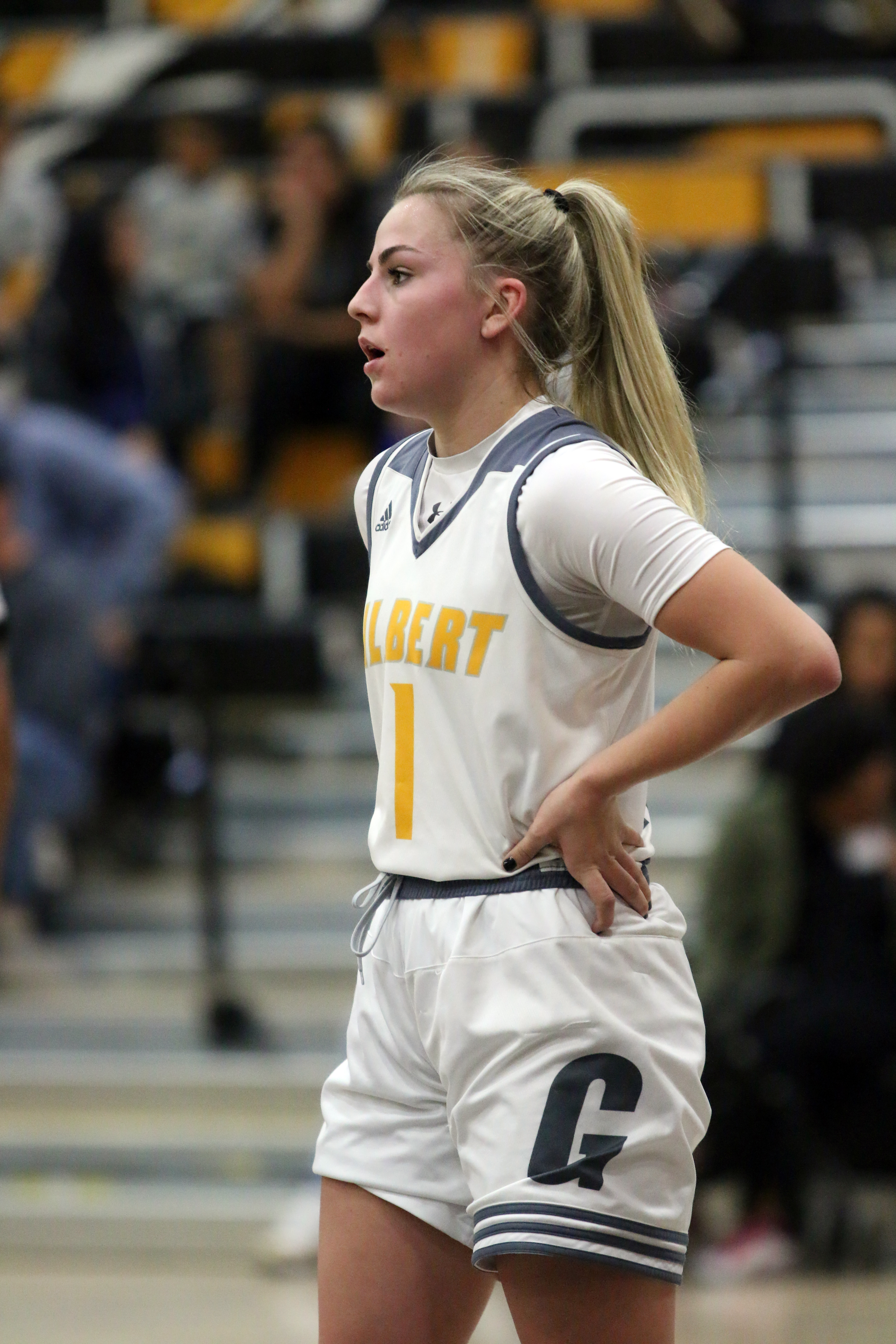
- Cavinder with Gilbert High School in 2017
- Basketball career

Personal information
- Born: January 13, 2001 (age 25) South Bend, Indiana, U.S.
- Listed height: 5 ft 6 in (1.68 m)

Career information
- High school: Gilbert (Gilbert, Arizona)
- College: Fresno State (2019–2022); Miami (FL) (2022–2023; 2024–2025)
- Position: Point guard
- Number: 14

Career highlights
- Mountain West Player of the Year (2021); 2x Second-team All-ACC (2023, 2025); 3× All-Mountain West Team (2020–2022); Mountain West Freshman of the Year (2020); Mountain West All-Freshman Team (2020)

Other information

Instagram information
- Page: cavindertwins
- Followers: 453 thousand

TikTok information
- Page: cavindertwins
- Followers: 4.5 million
- Last updated: May 24, 2026

Haley Cavinder (born January 13, 2001) is an American social media influencer and former college basketball player for the Miami Hurricanes of the Atlantic Coast Conference. Prior to Miami, she played for the Fresno State Bulldogs. Cavinder was an All-Mountain West Conference (MW) selection in each of her three seasons at Fresno State, and was named MW Player of the Year in her sophomore season. As a junior, she set the NCAA Division I single-season free throw percentage record before transferring to Miami where she was a two-time Second-team All-Atlantic Coast Conference selection.

Cavinder and her fraternal twin and teammate, Hanna, have a large social media following and share a TikTok account with millions of followers. In the last three seasons of their basketball careers, they were leading figures in college sports endorsements, signing name, image and likeness (NIL) deals with several companies, including Boost Mobile and WWE, and co-founding the clothing company Baseline Team.

== Early life ==
Cavinder was born in South Bend, Indiana, on January 13, 2001, one minute before and one pound (454 g) heavier than her twin sister, Hanna, to parents, Katie and Tom Cavinder. The family moved to the Phoenix area in the twins' early childhood. She started playing basketball before preschool and watched drills on YouTube to improve her skills. Cavinder competed in boys leagues until sixth grade before playing against girls who were two to three years older than her. She also played soccer and volleyball before focusing on basketball in middle school. She emulated her game after Skylar Diggins-Smith.

== High school career ==
Cavinder played for Gilbert High School in Gilbert, Arizona, alongside Hanna, and another sister, Brandi, who was two years ahead of them in school. The Cavinder twins were drawn there by coach Kyle Pedersen, who had trained them since they were in sixth grade and was their coach with Arizona Elite Basketball Club. As a freshman at Gilbert, Cavinder assumed a leading role along with Hanna, and helped the team reach the state quarterfinals. In her junior season, Cavinder averaged 23 points, 9.2 rebounds, 6.6 assists and 3.9 steals per game, leading Gilbert to the Class 6A state semifinals. She earned most valuable player honors at the Nike Tournament of Champions, an annual high school competition. As a senior, she averaged 21.8 points, 8.9 rebounds and 6.5 assists per game, helping her team reach the Class 5A state title game. She was named Arizona 5A Player of the Year and finished with 2,282 career points.

== College career ==
=== Fresno State ===
On February 1, 2020, Cavinder scored 31 points, a Fresno State single-game freshman record, along with six assists and five steals, in an 84–78 win against New Mexico. As a freshman, she averaged 15.7 points, 7.2 rebounds and 3.6 assists per game. Cavinder recorded the most points (512) and rebounds (233) by a freshman in program history. She was named Mountain West Freshman of the Year and to the All-Mountain West and All-Freshman Teams.

Cavinder scored a sophomore season-high 30 points in a 78–70 win over Nevada on January 14, 2021. As a sophomore, she averaged a conference-high 19.8 points, 7.5 rebounds, 3.8 assists and 1.7 steals per game, leading Fresno State to the second round of the Women's National Invitation Tournament. Cavinder became the fastest Fresno State player to reach 1,000 career points. She was named Mountain West Player of the Year, becoming the third sophomore to win the award. She earned All-Mountain West honors for a second straight season.

As a junior in 2021–22, Cavinder led the Bulldogs in scoring (19.8 per game), rebounding (9.4), and assists (5.8) on her way to her third straight All-Mountain West selection. She also had three triple-doubles, second in NCAA Division I to Iowa's Caitlin Clark and the most all-time by a Fresno State player. Cavinder set a new Division I single-season record for free throw percentage, with 97.3% by making 109 free throws in 112 attempts.

=== Miami (FL) ===
Following the season, the Cavinder twins entered the NCAA transfer portal and eventually announced on April 21, 2022, that they would transfer to the University of Miami. Both twins had two years of remaining athletic eligibility at the time of their transfer, because the NCAA did not count the 2020–21 season, extensively disrupted by COVID-19, against the eligibility of any basketball player.

On February 9, 2023, Cavinder scored a career-high 33 points, shooting 7-of-10 from three-point range, in an 86–82 win over 19th-ranked Florida State. She was named second-team All-Atlantic Coast Conference. Cavinder helped Miami reach its first Elite Eight at the 2023 NCAA tournament. As a senior, she averaged 12.2 points, 4.9 rebounds and 2.5 assists per game.

Shortly after the end of the 2022–23 season, the twins announced that they would end their college basketball careers, choosing not to take advantage of their extra year of eligibility. Their agent later told TheStreet that they would begin professional wrestling training at the WWE Performance Center later that spring.

=== TCU ===
On October 13, 2023, Cavinder came out of retirement and entered the transfer portal, intending to play her fifth and final season in 2024–25 without Hanna. One month later, she committed to TCU.

=== Return to Miami (FL) ===
On April 24, 2024, Cavinder de-committed from TCU and opted to instead return to the University of Miami alongside her sister Hanna for the 2024–25 season. For the week of November 11–17, Cavinder was named USBWA Ann Meyers Drysdale National Player of the Week for averaging 21.5 points, 4.5 rebounds and 4.0 assists per game while shooting 51.4 percent from the field, but not conference player of the week. At the December 20–21 Maui Classic Cavinder posted her third and fourth double-doubles of the season against Nevada and Oregon State, earning tournament MVP and leading her team to a championship with 22.5 points on 57.6 percent shooting (19-for-33), 12.0 rebounds, and 5.5 assists. The performance earned her ACC player of the week honors. Following a regular season in which she scored at least 10 points in 27 of 29 games (including three 30-point performances) and recorded 7 double doubles (including four consecutive), Cavinder finished 16th in the all-ACC voting just missing the 15-person first team recognition and earning a second consecutive second team honor.

== Career statistics ==
Legend
GP	Games played	GS	Games started	MPG	Minutes per game	FG%	Field goal percentage
3P%	3-point field goal percentage	FT%	Free throw percentage	RPG	Rebounds per game	APG	Assists per game
SPG	Steals per game	BPG	Blocks per game	TO	Turnovers per game	PPG	Points per game
**Bold**	Career high	*	Led Division I

=== College ===
Haley Cavinder NCAA Statistics
Year	Team	GP	GS	MPG	FG%	3P%	FT%	RPG	APG	SPG	BPG	TO	PPG
2019–20	Fresno State	32	31	34.3	38.5	34.3	68.1	7.3	3.7	1.5	0.2	2.4	16.0
2020–21	Fresno State	28	27	36.6	42.6	32.8	84.6	7.5	3.8	**1.7**	**0.5**	2.5	19.8
2021–22	Fresno State	29	29	**38.1**	44.6	37.3	**97.3***	**9.4**	**5.7**	1.5	0.1	2.9	**19.8**
2022–23	Miami	**35**	**35**	30.9	40.7	**40.4**	87.8	4.9	2.5	0.7	0.1	**1.6**	12.2
2024–25	Miami	29	29	34.8	**46.2**	31.3	80.0	6.5	4.7	0.8	0.2	2.9	18.2
**Career**		153	151	34.8	42.5	35.1	84.8	7.0	4.0	1.2	0.2	2.4	16.9

== Social media and endorsements ==
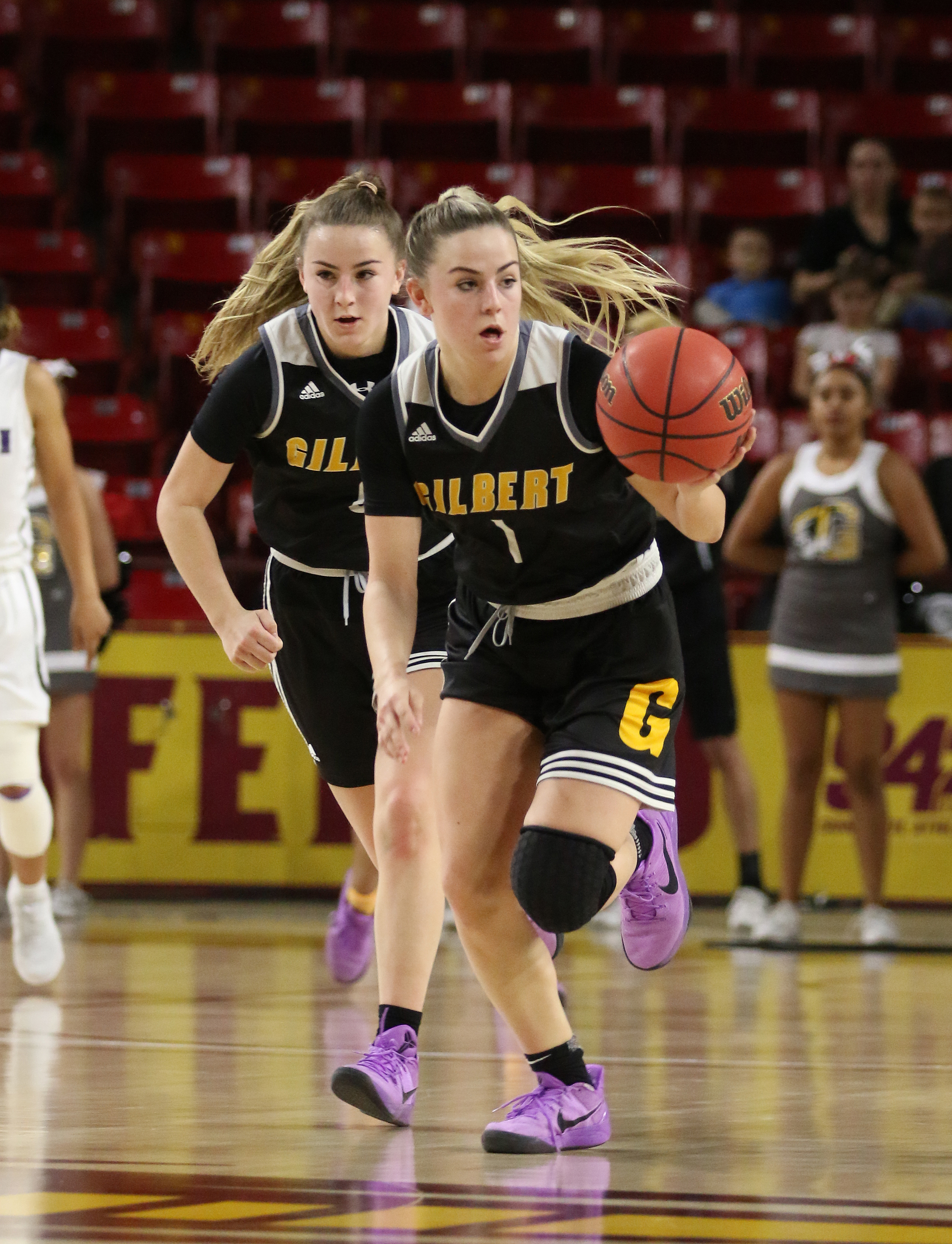
Cavinder (foreground) and her twin sister Hanna (background) playing for Gilbert High School in 2018

Cavinder has established a large social media following with Hanna. In April 2020, while bored at home during the COVID-19 pandemic, she was persuaded by Hanna, who used TikTok, to make videos together on a shared account on the platform. The videos feature Cavinder and her sister performing synchronized dances, dribbling and lip syncing side-by-side. By April 2022, the twins had four million followers on TikTok.

The Cavinder twins have made national headlines for their success with college sports endorsements and are among the most prominent college athletes in the field. On July 1, 2021, after the NCAA began allowing student-athletes to be compensated for the use of their name, image and likeness (NIL), the twins signed deals with Boost Mobile within minutes of it being permitted. On December 8, 2021, they signed with professional wrestling promotion WWE as part of its new Next In Line program to develop college athletes into potential WWE wrestlers. On January 18, 2022, the twins announced that they had co-founded the streetwear clothing startup Baseline Team. They were given 25 percent equity stake in the company and one of three seats on the board of directors. The twins have also signed NIL deals with Champs Sports, Eastbay, Gopuff and SoFi, among other companies. In July 2022, Forbes estimated that they had earned $1.7 million in endorsement deals. By November 2022, they had over 40 deals, more than any other women's basketball players at any level. The twins also started a podcast, Twin Talk, in December 2022 on iHeartRadio that initially focuses on student-athletes' perspectives on NIL; the twins' first official guest was LSU gymnast and leading NIL figure Olivia Dunne.

In early 2023, the twins were involved in the first known NCAA sanctions case related to NIL opportunities. On February 24, the Miami women's basketball program was placed on a year of probation and received other minor penalties; the twins received no direct sanctions. The NCAA found that the program and its head coach Katie Meier had violated NCAA rules by facilitating a meeting between the Cavinders and Miami-based businessman John Ruiz, a Miami alumnus and booster who has signed over 100 Hurricanes athletes in various sports to NIL deals, before they officially committed to transferring to the school.

On July 1, 2024, Haley Cavinder and her twin sister Hanna signed a three-year exclusive apparel and footwear agreement with Under Armour. As part of the deal, they became official brand ambassadors for the company.

In December 2024, the twins were named to the Forbes 30 Under 30 list for their social media leadership.

== Personal life ==
Haley has four sisters: eldest sister Brooke, next oldest Brandi, twin Hanna, and younger sister Natalie. Brandi was two classes ahead of the twins in high school and Natalie was one behind. Her height is 5 ft 6 in.

Cavinder has been in a relationship with Dallas Cowboys tight end Jake Ferguson since 2023, and the pair announced their engagement in April 2025. The pair married on June 20, 2026, at the Miami Biltmore Hotel in Florida.
