= Austin Ainge =

American basketball executive (born 1981)

Utah Jazz
- Title: President of Basketball Operations
- League: NBA

Personal information
- Born: September 29, 1981 (age 45) Gilbert, Arizona, U.S.
- Listed height: 6 ft 2 in (1.88 m)
- Listed weight: 180 lb (82 kg)

Career information
- High school: Highland (Gilbert, Arizona)
- College: BYU (2002–2007)
- NBA draft: 2007: undrafted
- Position: Point guard
- Coaching career: 2007–present

Career history

Coaching
- 2007–2008: Southern Utah (assistant)
- 2009–2011: Maine Red Claws

Career highlights
- NBA champion (2024)

Austin Ainge (born September 29, 1981) is an American basketball coach, executive, and former collegiate player. He is the current president of basketball operations for the Utah Jazz of the National Basketball Association (NBA).

== Playing career ==
Ainge attended Highland High School in Gilbert, Arizona, where he averaged 22 points, 5 rebounds, and 4 assists as a senior. He was named Fiesta Conference First Team, Conference MVP, East Valley Region First Team, and East Valley MVP.

Ainge had a successful basketball career at Brigham Young University where, as a two-time team captain, he led the school to two Mountain West Conference championships, three NCAA tournaments and one NIT appearance. Ainge was named All-Conference Honorable Mention twice. During the 2006–07 season, he led the MWC in three-point field goal percentage at 52.5% and was one of the best three-point shooters in the nation.

== Coaching career ==
=== Southern Utah ===
After his time at BYU, Ainge went on to serve a stint as an assistant coach for Southern Utah University, where he was responsible for perimeter players, recruiting, player development, video breakdown, and developing game plans. There, he worked under former Phoenix Suns assistant and BYU coach Roger Reid.

=== Boston Celtics ===
On July 21, 2009, Ainge was named the first head coach of the Maine Red Claws, an expansion team in the NBA Development League.

In May 2011, Ainge was named Director of Player Personnel for the Boston Celtics. Previously, Ainge performed scouting duties for the Celtics organization. As a part of this position, he worked with Celtics rookies J.R. Giddens and Bill Walker while they were on assignment with the Utah Flash of the NBA Development League.

=== Utah Jazz ===
On June 2, 2025, the Utah Jazz hired Ainge away from the Celtics to serve as the team's president of basketball operations.

== Personal life ==
Austin is the son of former NBA player Danny Ainge. Ainge and his wife, Cora, have three children: Dre, Fin, and Otto.
