= Campo Verde High School =

- Home of the Coyotes

Location
- 3870 S Quartz St; Gilbert, Maricopa, Arizona 85297; United States
- 33.2789°N 111.7614°W

Information
- Type: Public High school
- Motto: Every Person. Every Day.
- Established: 2009
- School district: Gilbert Public Schools
- Principal: Tyler Dumas
- Teaching staff: 96.50 (FTE)
- Grades: 9–12
- Enrollment: 1,925 (2023–2024)
- Student to teacher ratio: 19.95
- Campus type: Urban
- Colors: Dark Green and Copper
- Athletics conference: 5A - East Section I .
- Mascot: Coyotes
- Nickname: The Coyotes
- Rival: Mesquite High School, Williams Field High School
- Website: https://campoverdehigh.gilbertschools.net/
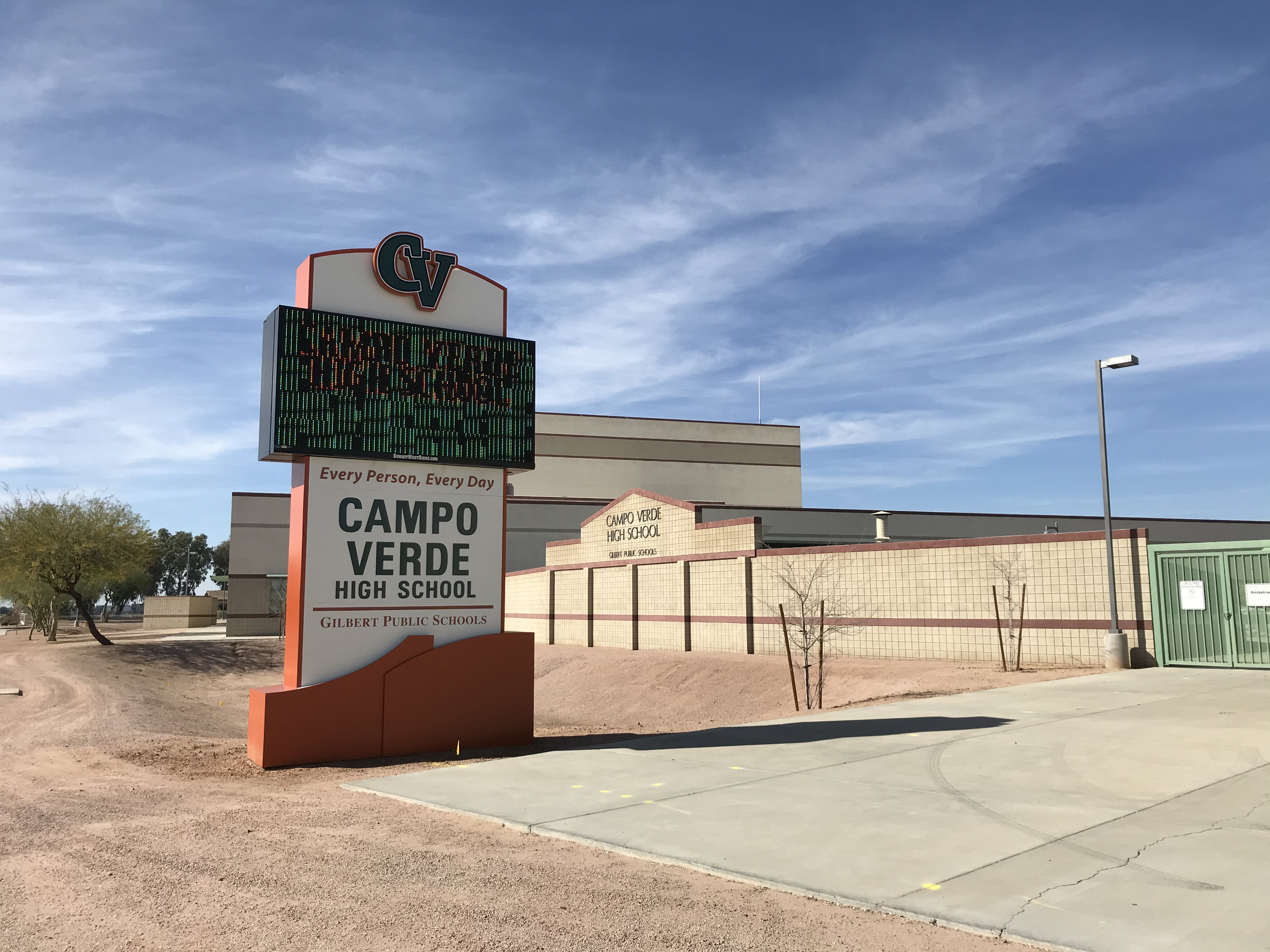
- Campo Verde High School, as viewed from Germann road.

Campo Verde High School (CVHS) is a public high school located in Gilbert, Arizona, United States. It was built in 2009 and is part of the Gilbert Public Schools district. The school accommodates grades 9–12, and in 2018, the school had a student body of 2,091.

For the 2023-24 school year Campo Verde High School received an 'A' school grade from the Arizona Department of Education.

Campo Verde's colors are Dark Green and Copper and the teams are collectively called the Coyotes. The school is a member of the Arizona Interscholastic Association's 5A - San Tan Conference and competes in Division I and II sports.

The overarching philosophy of the high school is to promote an environment that sparks creativity, inspires innovation, embraces the principles of citizenship, and fosters an atmosphere of lifelong learning. Graduates of CVHS are groomed to be responsible, well-rounded, ethical members of society positioned to succeed in their next level of achievement as employees, students pursuing continued education, employers, or a combination of these outcomes. High expectations at all levels, fluid and clear channels of communication, strong parental involvement, and endless possibilities frame the daily operations at Campo Verde High School. In addition, evaluation of student learning outcomes, institutional effectiveness, and structured, self-reflection play critical roles in the evolution of the school.

== History ==
The school was built by Core Construction and opened in the fall of 2009. The school's name is Spanish for "green field," an allusion to the role of Spanish-speaking people in building Gilbert.

In February 2010, the district installed two 200-kilowatt (270 hp) solar panels on the site to help power a third of the school.

== Demographics ==
Campo Verde High School has a nearly equal enrollment of male (51%) and female (49%) students, with a total population of 2094 in the 2017-2018 school year.. The population has steadily grown since its opening in 2009 and offers a rich academic experience, diverse course offerings, and a wide variety of activities, clubs, and organizations. The campus has hosted an array of events including band competitions, sporting events, community gatherings, and most recently the regional host for the Fiesta Bowl Charities/Be Kind event on August 29, 2017, with over 4000 attendees and ESPN coverage. The school's participation in community focused events is a direct reflection of the guiding principles that frame the decisions made, the outcomes experienced, and the passion of the leadership, faculty and staff to provide diverse learning opportunities for all.

== Extracurricular activities ==
=== Athletics ===
For the 2010–11 school year, CVHS began fielding varsity sports and also opened its doors to juniors (11th grade students). In the 2011–2012 school year it had its first senior graduating class, and in the 2012–2013 year it had its first four-year graduation.

- Badminton
- Baseball
- Basketball (Boys)
- Basketball (Girls)
- Cheer
- Cross Country
- Football
- Golf (Boys)
- Golf (Girls)
- Soccer (Boys)
- Soccer (Girls)
- Softball
- Swim and Dive
- Tennis (Boys)
- Tennis (Girls)
- Track and field
- Volleyball (Boys) 2019 5A State Champions
- Volleyball (Girls)
- Wrestling

=== Band ===
The Coyote Pride Marching Band, directed by Matt Kozacek has tripled in size over the past three years, currently has 97 members, and has become one of Arizona's elite band programs. On August 13, 2017, The Coyote Pride Marching Band performed the National Anthem at a televised Diamondbacks vs. Cubs baseball game at Chase Field, in Phoenix, AZ with over 41,000 in attendance. The band programs have received numerous awards and state championships under Mr. Kozacek's leadership. He believes firmly in music and arts education for all students and his core philosophies include teaching life skills and passion through music.
