= Gilbert High School (Arizona) =

Public high school in Gilbert, Arizona

- Home of the Tigers

Location
- 1101 E Elliot Rd; Gilbert, Arizona 85234; United States; 33°20′55″N 111°46′00″W

Information
- Type: Public high school
- Motto: "...Continuing a tradition of excellence one student at a time"
- Established: 1917 (109 years ago), opened 1918
- School district: Gilbert Public Schools
- CEEB code: 030140
- NCES School ID: 040340000258
- Principal: Lucas Blackburn
- Teaching staff: 120.40 (FTE)
- Grades: 9–12
- Enrollment: 2,334 (2023–2024)
- Student to teacher ratio: 19.39
- Campus type: Urban
- Colors: Black and gold
- Athletics conference: 5A – San Tan, Division I and II
- Mascot: Tiger
- Nickname: Gilbert Tigers
- Rival: Highland High School
- Newspaper: Tiger Nation Weekly Newsletter
- Yearbook: Outside the Box
- Feeder schools: Greenfield Junior High School and Mesquite Junior High School
- Website: High School website
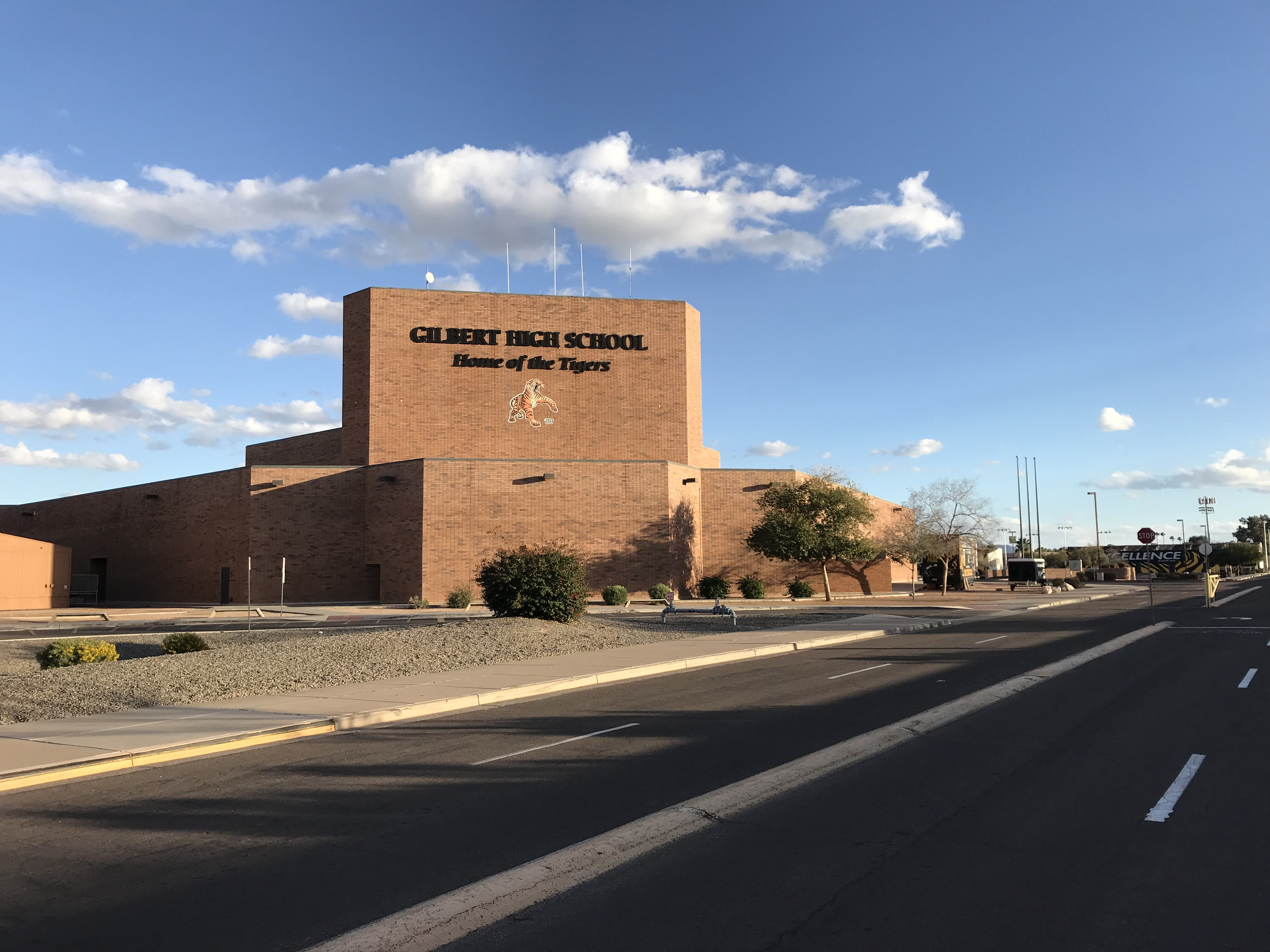
- Gilbert High School auditorium, as viewed from road.

Gilbert High School (GHS) is the oldest public high school in Gilbert, Arizona, United States and is part of Gilbert Public Schools. It opened in 1918 and celebrated its 100th graduating class in 2017. The school enrolled 2,051 students in 2018–19, grades 9–12, and operates on a traditional school calendar. Gilbert's colors are black and gold and the teams are collectively called the Tigers.

In 2017, Gilbert High School earned the A+ School of Excellence™ Award from the Arizona Educational Foundation. The school is a member of the Arizona Interscholastic Association's 5A San Tan Athletics Conference and competes in Division I and II sports.

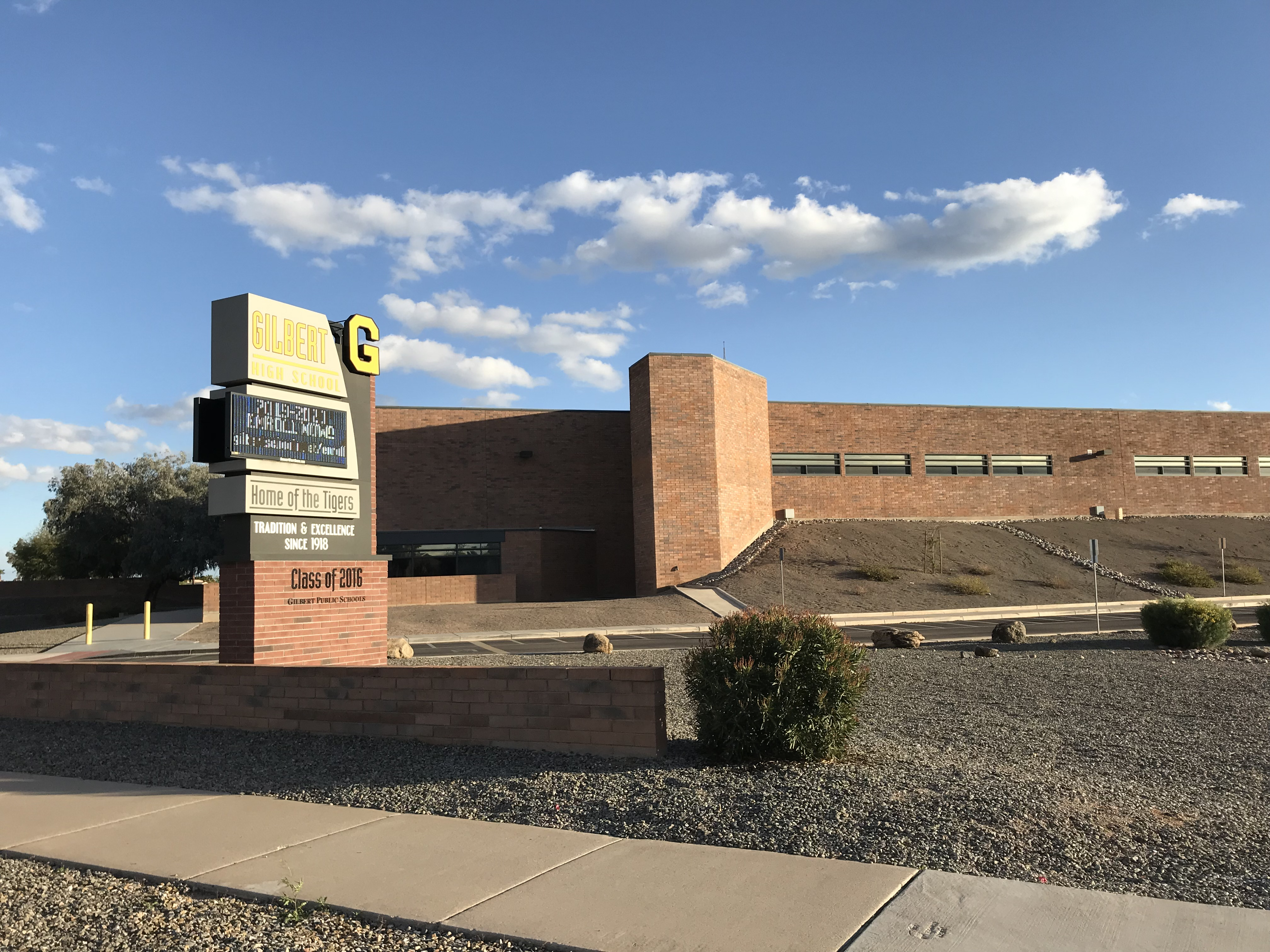
Gilbert High School Marquee

== History ==
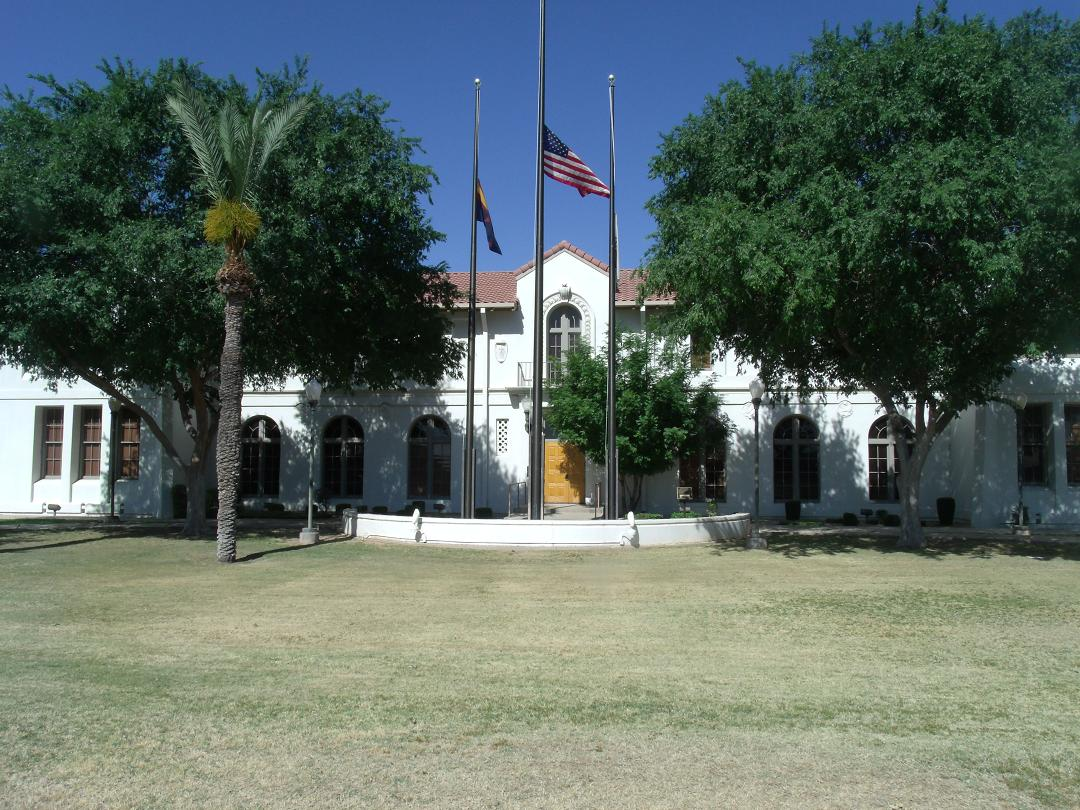
Gilbert High School built in 1918 in Gilbert Arizona. It now houses the Gilbert Public School District Office.

On June 19, 1917, an election was held "for the purpose of establishing and maintaining a high school" in the recently formed Gilbert School District #41. Gilbert High School's first building opened in 1917. The first graduating class, consisting of 4 graduates, was in 1918.

In the 1960s, Gilbert relocated to a new site where present day Mesquite Junior High School now stands. In 1987, the school moved to its current location. Gilbert High School's original site is now the district administration building. In 2017, Gilbert High celebrated its 100th graduating class, consisting of 600 students.

== Demographics ==
As of 2018–19, there were 102 total teachers, principals, and other school leaders and 2,051 students currently enrolled at the school with enrollment listed at 100%. Of the 102 teachers, principals, and other school leaders, 85 (83.33%) are listed as having greater than 3 years experience in the field and 7 (6.86%) of 102 are listed as teaching out of the subject area in which they are certified.

The racial makeup of the students, in 2018–19, was 3.31% African American, 3.56% Asian, 28.77% Hispanic, 1.66% Native American, 0.88% Pacific Islander, and 59.09% White. The four-year graduation rate within the first 4 years of enrolling in high school was 88.89%. Graduation rates were broken down to: 85.28% Male, 92.36% Female, 80% African American, 86.36% Asian, 86.47% Hispanic, N/A% Native American, 90.7% White, 81.82% Multiple Races, 81.9% Low SES, and 76.19% Special Education. In 2015–2016, reports indicate 414 students were enrolled in at least one advanced placement course, 515 students with chronic absenteeism, 31 indents of violence and 2 students reported as harassed or bullied based on sex, race, color, national origin or disability.

== Academics ==
Gilbert High School is said to offer "over 220 courses in 14 departments" including: Accelerated Learning, Advanced Placement and Honors Curriculum, Comprehensive Core Curriculum, School-to-Work, Community College Dual Credit Courses, ELL, On-Site Special Education, and Vocational Career /Technological Education Programs.

In 2017, Gilbert High School earned the A+ School of Excellence™ Award from the Arizona Educational Foundation. The award program is said to be "a comprehensive school assessment program that celebrates outstanding schools and brings to light the positive stories and successes happening in public schools every day".

In the fiscal year 2019, the Arizona Department of Education published an annual achievement profile for Gilbert High School resulting in a grade of "B" based on an A through F scale. Scores were based on "year to year student academic growth, proficiency on English language arts, math and science, the proficiency and academic growth of English language learners, indicators that an elementary student is ready for success in high school and that high school students are ready to succeed in a career or higher education and high school graduation rates".

In 2020, the United States national nonprofit organization, GreatSchools, gives Gilbert High School a 5/10 (down from 7/10 in 2019) overall rating noting that students perform "average on state tests, have above average college readiness measures, and are making average year-over-year academic improvement. This school is said to have below average results in how well it’s serving disadvantaged and low income students. The organization gives Gilbert High School academic scores of 7/10 (down from 8/10 in 2019) for "college readiness", 5/10 (down from 7/10 in 2019) for standardized "test scores", and 5/10 (down from 6/10 in 2019) for "Academic progress". The school was also given equity scores of 2/10 (down from 5/10 in 2019) for "equity overview" (disadvantaged students are falling behind) and 3/10 for "low income students" (low-income kids are being left behind).

== Extracurricular activities ==
=== Athletics ===
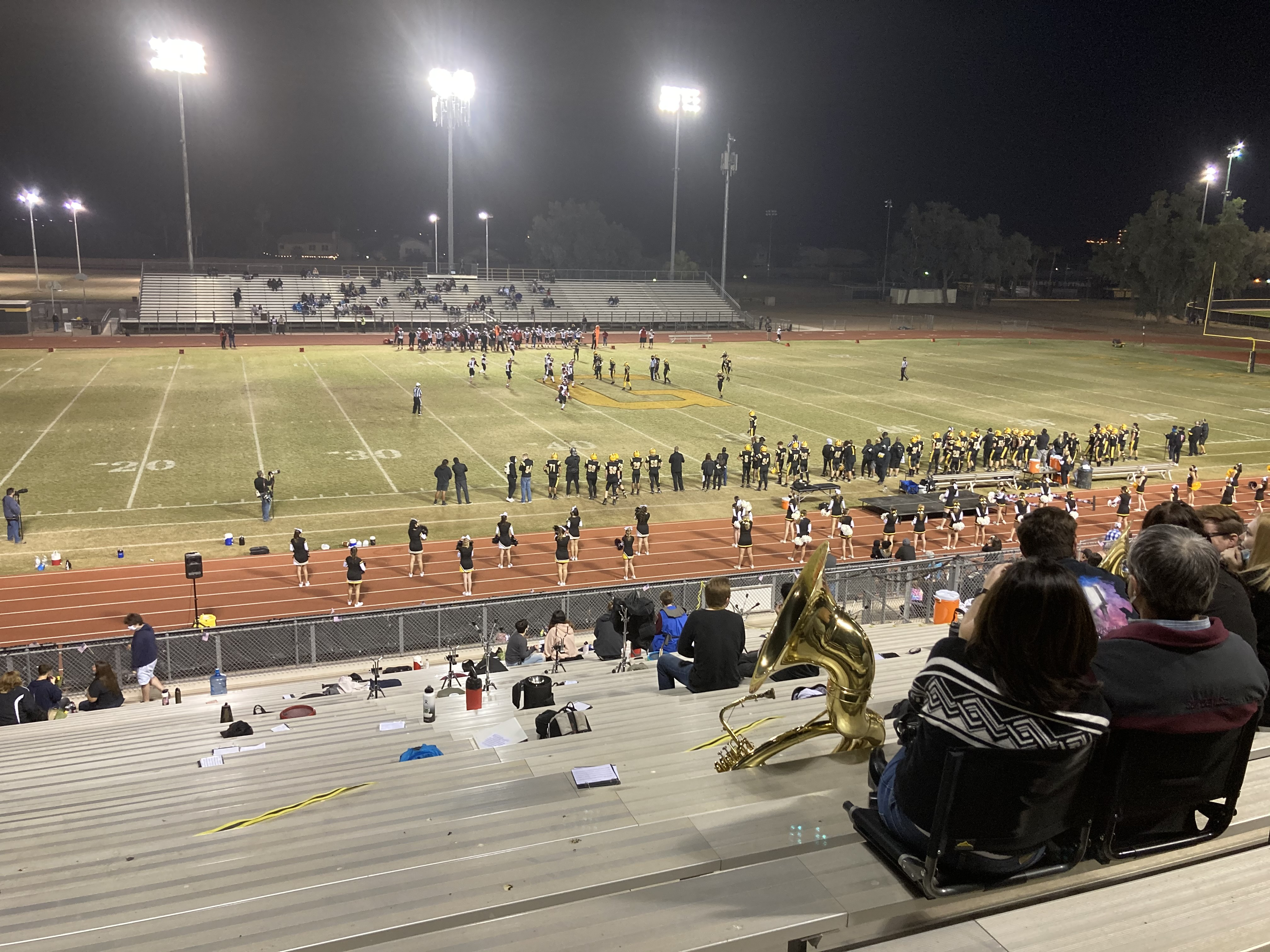
Varsity boys' football game in November 2020.

Gilbert High School is one of six high schools in the Arizona 5A San Tan Athletics Conference. In 2017, the boys soccer team won the 2017 Arizona championship and finished 6th in the nation. In 2019, the boys Basketball Varsity team won the 2018–19 5A State of Arizona Championship at Desert Financial Arena. and finished with a 29–1 record.

State championships for the Tigers in sports include the following:

- Boys' baseball: 1966, 1977, 1980, 1984, 1985, 1987, and 1991
- Boys' basketball: 1962, 1985, 2003, and 2019
- Girls' basketball: 1984, 1986, 1991, and 1992
- Girls' cross country: 1992
- Boys' cross country: 2020
- Boys' football: 1973, 1975, 1978, and 1985
- Girls' golf: 1996
- Boys' soccer: 2004 and 2017
- Boys' track and field: 1927, 1960, 1961, 1962, 1971, 1972, 1983, 1984, and 1985
- Girls' track and field: 1983 and 1990
- Boys' volleyball: 2012
- Girls' volleyball: 1972, 1995, 2003, 2006, and 2011
- Boys' wrestling: 1985 and 1993

=== Band ===
Gilbert Band finished first in the 2018 Band State Championship Division 5. The band program is one of the top programs in the state, having their marching band, the Gilbert Tiger Pride, finish top 10 the past 6 years in Arizona and fourth place during the 2016 season. Other programs include the Gilbert Indoor Percussion and the Gilbert Black Guard. These programs both finished 2nd in Arizona during the 2017 season. During the 2018 season, both guard and drumline made it to finals for the western regional competition in California and placed 1st in the state of Arizona at WGAZ championships. The indoor percussion received first place in Arizona recently in 2014 and 2016, along with a 4th-place finish at the WGI World Championships in 2014.

=== Clubs and activities ===
Gilbert High School Air Force Junior ROTC AZ-941 placed first in the JROTC Desert Classic Drill Competition State Championship in 2019.

== Awards ==
- In 2017, Gilbert High School earned the A+ School of Excellence™ Award from the Arizona Educational Foundation. As of spring 2019, thirteen Gilbert Public Schools have earned the award.
- In 2018, the Gilbert Tiger was awarded "Best Mascot" and the campus preschool was awarded "Best Preschool Program" in the Best of Gilbert 2018 issue of the East Valley Tribune.

== Notable alumni ==
- Brandon Briones, gymnast, member of the United States men's national artistic gymnastics team, and 2018 Summer Youth Olympics gold medalist
- Haley Cavinder, Miami Hurricanes women's basketball player and social media personality
- Hanna Cavinder, Miami Hurricanes women's basketball player and social media personality
- Alan Gordon, former professional soccer player
- D. J. Peterson, professional baseball player, Colorado Rockies
- Dustin Peterson, professional baseball player, Philadelphia Phillies
- Jack Plummer, NFL quarterback for the Carolina Panthers, played college football at Purdue, California, and Louisville.
- Dennis Sarfate, former professional baseball player, Baltimore Orioles, Houston Astros, and Milwaukee Brewers
- Stephen Tarpley, former professional baseball player, Miami Marlins, New York Mets, and New York Yankees
- Ryan Toolson, former professional international league basketball player
- Rick Woolstenhulme Jr., rock music drummer, Lifehouse

== In popular media ==
Student Navey Baker was featured in the October 4, 2013, episode of NPR show This American Life for her role as the Gilbert High Tiger mascot. She was also featured on the second season of the Hulu original documentary series, Behind the Mask.

Gilbert High School senior Samantha LaMay made the transformation from lacrosse-playing tomboy to stylish girly girl on the season premiere of MTV’s "Made" in 2005.
