= Gilbert Public Schools =

School district based in Gilbert, Arizona

- Seal of GPS

Address
- 140 S. Gilbert Rd. Gilbert, Maricopa, Arizona, 85296; United States
- Coordinates: 33°21′09″N 111°42′06″W

District information
- Type: Public
- Motto: Technology. Scholarship. Innovation.
- Grades: Pre K-12
- Established: 1913
- Superintendent: Shane McCord
- School board: 5 members
- Governing agency: Gilbert Public Schools Board
- Schools: 39
- Budget: $293,190,000 (2016-17)
- NCES District ID: 0403400

Students and staff
- Students: 34,335 (2018-2019)
- Teachers: 1,898.25 (2018-2019)
- Staff: 1,983.40 (2018-2019)
- Student–teacher ratio: 18.09 (2018-2019)

Other information
- Teachers' unions: Arizona Education Association
- Website: www.gilbertschools.net

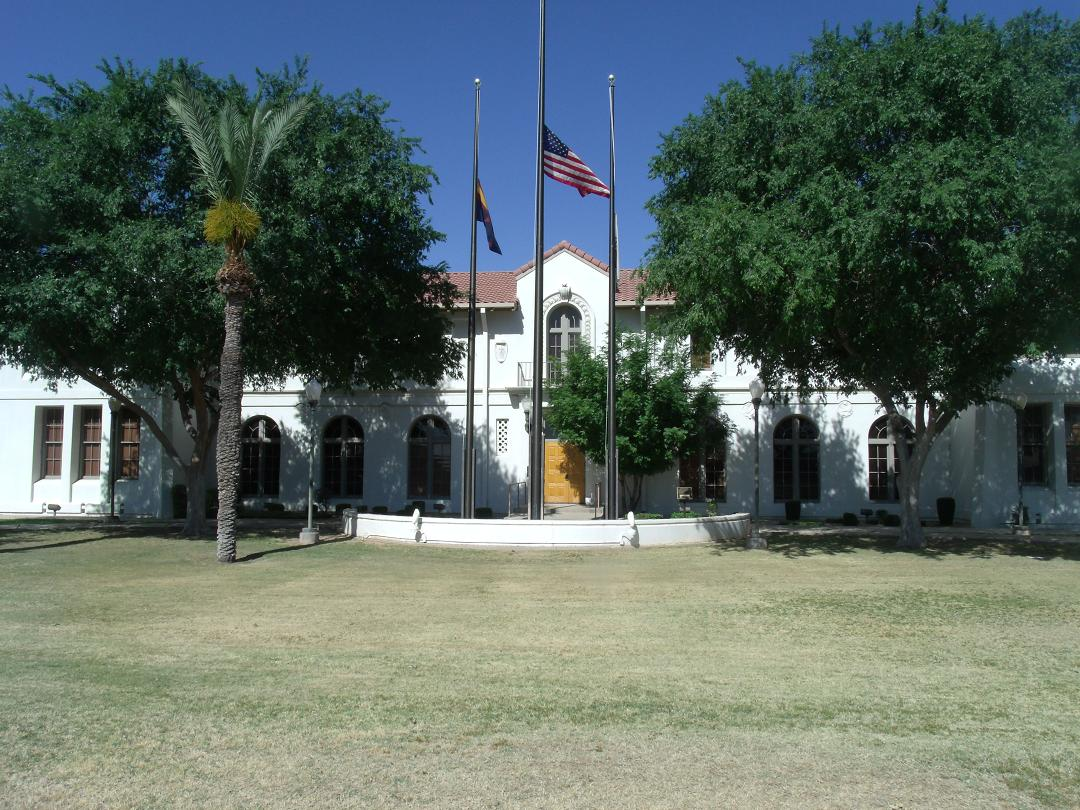
Gilbert High School was built in 1917. It now houses the Gilbert Public School District Office. The structure is listed as historical by the Gilbert Heritage District.

Gilbert Unified School District #41 (GUSD), also known as Gilbert Public Schools (GPS), is a school district based in Gilbert, Arizona, United States, in the Phoenix metropolitan area. The 60.26-square-mile (156.1 km^{2}) district is the 7th largest in Arizona, and serves over 34,000 students at 39 schools across Gilbert, Chandler, and Mesa.

In 2018, the district was named "4th Best School District in America" by the National Council for Home Safety and Security and "Best Public School/District" in the "Best of Gilbert 2018" issue of the East Valley Tribune. As of 2025, fifteen GPS schools have earned the "A+ School of Excellence™ Award" from the Arizona Educational Foundation. All GPS schools achieved either an 'A' or 'B' letter grade for the 23/24 school year, rating them as excellent or highly performing by the Arizona Department of Education.

== History ==
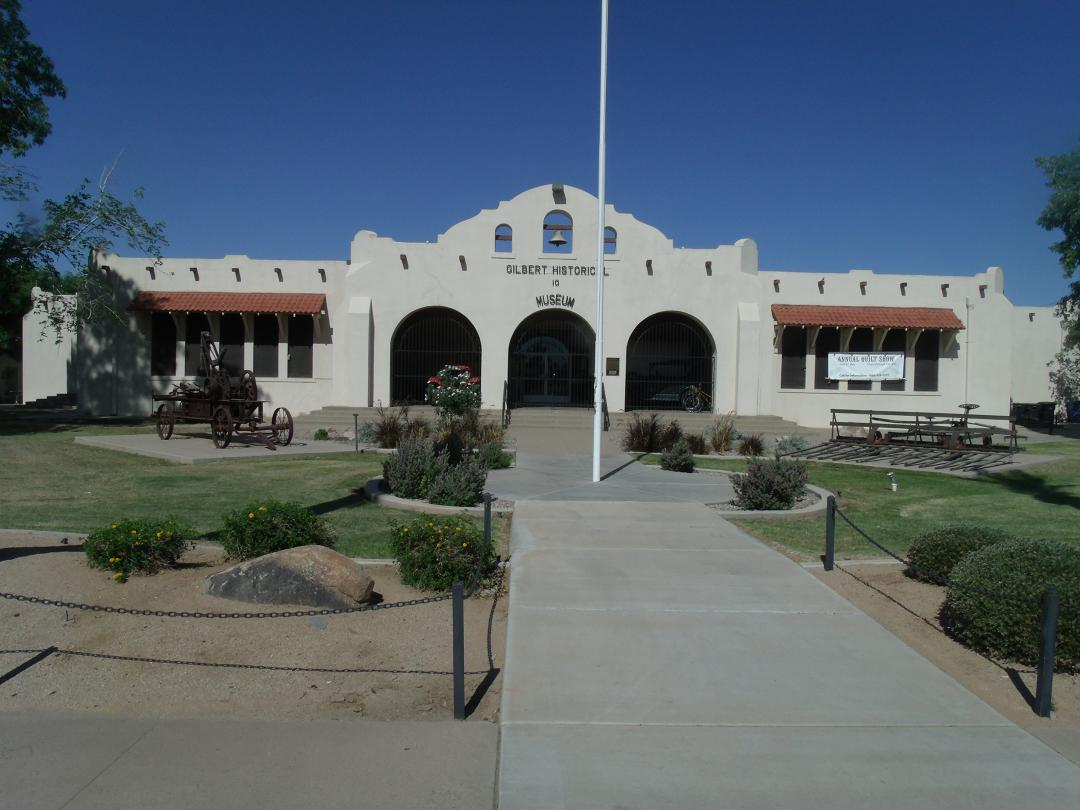
Gilbert Elementary School was built in 1913. It is located at 10 S. Gilbert Rd., and now houses the Gilbert Historical Museum. It is listed in the National Register of Historic Places.

In 1900, the first school in Gilbert was built on the southwest corner of Baseline and Cooper roads. This school was moved in 1909 to the northeast corner of Guadalupe and Cooper roads. It was named Highland because this was the highest land south of the Salt River. It was part of the Mesa Unified School District #4.

In 1913, with the completion of its first elementary school, Gilbert School District #41 was formed. The new school was located on the corner of Elliot and Gilbert roads, and consisted of four classrooms, two offices, an auditorium, and a basement below the auditorium. In 1977, the building closed for classroom use. In 1982, it became the Gilbert Historical Museum.

In 1917, an election was held "for the purpose of establishing and maintaining a high school" in the recently formed Gilbert School District #41. Gilbert's first high school, Gilbert High School, opened in 1917 on the southwest corner of Gilbert and Elliot roads. The first graduating class, consisting of four graduates, was in 1918. Gilbert High School has since been relocated, and the original site is now the Gilbert Public Schools district administration building.

Since opening its first school in 1913, Gilbert Public Schools has grown to serve over 35,000 students at 40 schools across Gilbert, Chandler, and Mesa.

Message displayed to teachers and students when trying to access Wikipedia

== Schools ==
Canyon Valley School logo

Schools in the district include 26 elementary schools (Pre K–6); six junior high schools (7–8), five high schools (9–12), two academies, one global academy, and one alternative education school (7–12).

=== High schools ===
Name	Canyon Valley	Campo Verde	Desert Ridge	Gilbert	Highland	Mesquite
Location	Mesa	Gilbert	Mesa	Gilbert	Gilbert	Gilbert
Opened	2010	2009	2002	1918, 1987 (current building)	1993	1998
Colors	Purple, black	Dark green, copper	Cardinal red, black	Black, gold	Teal, black	Royal blue, silver
Mascot	Lion	Coyote	Jaguar	Tiger	Hawk	Wildcat
Principal	Adam Strock	Tyler Dumas	Scott Smith	Lucas Blackburn	Brian Yee	Shawn Lynch
Athletic conference	N/A	5A	6A	6A	6A	4A
Enrollment (2018, 100th day)		1985	2709	2059	3046	1635
Website	Official	Official	Official	Official	Official	Official

=== Junior high schools ===
Name	Desert Ridge	Greenfield	Highland	Mesquite	South Valley
Location	Mesa	Gilbert	Mesa	Gilbert	Gilbert
Colors	Purple, teal, black	Green, gold	Maroon, gold, blue	Blue, silver	Red, white, black
Mascot	Rattler	Grizzly	Hurricane	Mustang	Sabercat
Principal	Eric Cruz	Jodi Smith	Sean Jonaitis	Kari Castro	Jonathan Schley
Feeder for (HS)	Desert Ridge	Gilbert, Highland	Highland	Mesquite, Gilbert	Campo Verde
Enrollment (2018, 100th day)	1234	905	1216	994	1013
Website	Official	Official	Official	Official	Official

=== Elementary schools ===
==== Enrollment on 100th day, 2018 ====
- Ashland Ranch - 819
- Augusta Ranch - 1019
- Boulder Creek - 633
- Burk - 382
- Canyon Rim - 842
- Carol Rae Ranch - 572
- Finley Farms - 652
- Gilbert Elementary - 527
- Greenfield Elementary - 955
- Harris - 460
- Highland Park - 888
- Islands - N/A
- Meridian - 831
- Mesquite - 599
- Neely Traditional Academy - N/A
- Oak Tree - 580
- Patterson - 601
- Pioneer - 553
- Playa del Rey - 460
- Quartz Hill - 663
- Settler's Point - 634
- Sonoma Ranch - 476
- Spectrum - 624
- Superstition Springs - 714
- Towne Meadows - 711
- Val Vista Lakes - 539

=== Academies and alternative education ===
- Canyon Valley School (grades 7-12) - alternative education (322 enrolled as of 100th day 2018)
- Distance Learning Online (grades 7-12) - Gilbert Public Schools offers its own online schooling program through its Distance Learning Center. Classes range from History to Physical Education. Gilbert accepts credits earned from major online schools, such as Primavera.
- Gilbert Classical Academy (grades 7-12) - opened August 2007, replacing the GPS Technology and Leadership Academy (526 enrolled as of 100th day 2018)
- Global Academy - opened August, 2011
- Neely Traditional Academy (grades K-6; 779 enrolled as of 100th day 2018)
- Performance Academy at Mesquite Elementary (grades 4-8)
- Traditional Program at Canyon Rim Elementary (grades K-6)
- Traditional Program at Spectrum Elementary (grades K-6)

=== Awards ===
- The district was named "4th Best School District in America" by the National Council for Home Safety and Security in 2017 and 2018.
- GPS has been voted "Best Public School/District" in the "Best of the Best" annual issues of the East Valley Tribune for five consecutive years, starting in 2019.
- Fifteen GPS schools had earned the "A+ School of Excellence™ Award" from the Arizona Educational Foundation as of spring 2025.
- Neely Traditional Academy (grades K-6) is an elementary school in Gilbert. The school was opened in 1981, and became a traditional academy in 1999. Neely received the National Blue Ribbon School award in 2009 and 2023.

== Wikipedia Ban ==
Message displayed when trying to access Wikipedia's website

On November 16th, 2026, Gilbert Public Schools banned Wikipedia from school computers, with both teachers and students unable to access the website, along with other sites made by the Wikimedia Foundation.

== See also ==
- East Valley Institute of Technology
- Mesa Public Schools
