= Southwest Conference women's basketball tournament =

Southwest Conference women's basketball tournament (defunct)
- Conference basketball championship
- Sport: College basketball
- Conference: Southwest Conference
- Number of teams: 9
- Format: Single-elimination tournament
- Played: 1983-1996
- Most championships: Texas Longhorns women's basketball (9)

Host stadiums
- Gregory Gym (1983); Hofheinz Pavilion (1984); Moody Coliseum (1985-96)

Host locations
- Austin, TX (1983); Houston, TX (1984); Dallas, TX (1985-96)

The Southwest Conference women's basketball tournament, also called the SWC Classic, was the conference championship tournament in women's basketball for the Southwest Conference. The tournament was held annually between 1983 and 1996, after which the Southwest Conference was dissolved.

The winner of the tournament was guaranteed a spot in the NCAA basketball tournament each year.

== Champions ==
Year	Champion	Score	Runner-Up	MVP	Venue (and city)
1983	Texas	80–54	Arkansas	Annette Smith, Texas	Gregory Gym (Austin, Texas)
1984	Texas	83–73	Texas Tech	Carolyn Thompson, Texas Tech	Hofheinz Pavilion (Houston, Texas)
1985	Texas	82–62	Texas Tech	Fran Harris, Texas	Moody Coliseum (Dallas, Texas)
1986	Texas	77–53	Texas Tech	Beverly Williams, Texas	Moody Coliseum (Dallas, Texas)
1987	Texas	72–70	Arkansas	Beverly Williams, Texas	Moody Coliseum (Dallas, Texas)
1988	Texas	88–61	Texas Tech	Doreatha Cornwell, Texas	Moody Coliseum (Dallas, Texas)
1989	Texas	101–99	Arkansas	Clarissa Davis, Texas	Moody Coliseum (Dallas, Texas)
1990	Texas	63–60	Texas Tech	Edna Campbell, Texas	Moody Coliseum (Dallas, Texas)
1991	Arkansas	60–51	Texas Tech	Amber Nicholas, Arkansas	Moody Coliseum (Dallas, Texas)
1992	Texas Tech	76–74	Texas	Sheryl Swoopes, Texas Tech	Moody Coliseum (Dallas, Texas)
1993	Texas Tech	78–71	Texas	Sheryl Swoopes, Texas Tech	Moody Coliseum (Dallas, Texas)
1994	Texas	71–69	Texas Tech	Connie Robinson, Texas Tech	Moody Coliseum (Dallas, Texas)
1995	Texas Tech	84–62	SMU	Michi Atkins, Texas Tech	Moody Coliseum (Dallas, Texas)
1996	Texas A&M	72–68	Texas Tech	Alicia Thompson, Texas Tech	Moody Coliseum (Dallas, Texas)

== Championships by school ==
Titles	School
9	Texas
3	Texas Tech
1	Texas A&M
1	Arkansas
