= 1992 Southwest Conference women's basketball tournament =

- Classification: Division I
- Teams: 8
- Site: Moody Coliseum; Dallas, Texas
- Champions: Texas Tech (1st title)
- Winning coach: Marsha Sharp (1st title)
- MVP: Sheryl Swoopes (Texas Tech)

1991–92 Southwest Conference women's basketball standings
	Conf.				Overall
Team	W		L	PCT	W		L	PCT
No. 12 Texas Tech†	13	–	1	.929	27	–	5	.844
No. 19 Texas	11	–	3	.786	21	–	10	.677
No. 22 Houston	10	–	4	.714	22	–	8	.733
SMU	7	–	7	.500	17	–	12	.586
Texas A&M	7	–	7	.500	15	–	13	.536
Rice	5	–	9	.357	13	–	15	.464
Baylor	3	–	11	.214	11	–	17	.393
TCU	0	–	14	.000	4	–	24	.143
† 1992 SWC tournament winner Rankings from AP Poll

The 1992 Southwest Conference women's basketball tournament was held March 11–14, 1992, at Moody Coliseum in Dallas, Texas.

Number 1 seed Texas Tech defeated 2 seed Texas 76–74 to win their 1st championship and receive the conference's automatic bid to the 1992 NCAA tournament.

Texas and Houston received at-large bids to the NCAA tournament.

== Format and seeding ==
The tournament consisted of an 8 team single-elimination tournament.

Place	Seed	Team	Conference			Overall		
Place	Seed	Team	W	L	%	W	L	%
1	1	Texas Tech	13	1	.929	27	5	.844
2	2	Texas	11	3	.786	21	10	.677
3	3	Houston	10	4	.714	22	8	.733
4	4	SMU	7	7	.500	17	12	.586
4	5	Texas A&M	7	7	.500	15	13	.536
6	6	Rice	5	9	.357	13	15	.464
8	7	Baylor	3	11	.214	11	117	.086
8	8	TCU	0	14	.000	4	24	.143

== Tournament ==
Quarterfinal; Wednesday, March 11
1	Texas Tech	89
8	TCU	62
4	SMU	85
5	Texas A&M	77
3	Houston	63
6	Rice	57
2	Texas	84
7	Baylor	56

Semifinals; Thursday, March 12
1	Texas Tech	79
4	SMU	67
3	Houston	60
2	Texas	70

Finals; Saturday, March 14
1	Texas Tech	76
2	Texas	74
