= 1984 Southwest Conference women's basketball tournament =

- Classification: Division I
- Teams: 6
- Site: Hofheinz Pavilion; Houston, Texas
- Champions: Texas (2nd title)
- Winning coach: Jody Conradt (2nd title)
- MVP: Carolyn Thompson (Texas Tech)

1983–84 Southwest Conference women's basketball standings
	Conf.				Overall
Team	W		L	PCT	W		L	PCT
No. 1 Texas†	16	–	0	1.000	32	–	3	.914
Texas Tech	13	–	3	.813	23	–	7	.767
Arkansas	11	–	5	.688	20	–	9	.690
Baylor	9	–	7	.563	15	–	12	.556
Houston	9	–	7	.563	16	–	12	.571
Texas A&M	6	–	10	.375	13	–	15	.464
SMU	4	–	12	.250	11	–	15	.423
Rice	3	–	13	.188	9	–	17	.346
TCU	1	–	15	.063	6	–	22	.214
† 1984 SWC tournament winner Rankings from AP Poll

The 1984 Southwest Conference women's basketball tournament was held March 5–10, 1984, at Hofheinz Pavilion in Houston, Texas.

Number 1 seed Texas defeated 2 seed Texas Tech 83–73 to win their second championship and receive the conference's automatic bid to the 1984 NCAA tournament.

Despite the loss, Texas Tech received an at-large bid to the NCAA tournament.

== Format and seeding ==
The tournament consisted of a 6 team single-elimination tournament. The top two seeds had a bye to the Semifinals. The First round games occurred at campus sites.

Place	Seed	Team	Conference			Overall		
Place	Seed	Team	W	L	%	W	L	%
1	1	Texas	16	0	1.000	32	3	.914
2	2	Texas Tech	13	3	.813	23	7	.767
3	3	Arkansas	11	5	.688	20	9	.690
4	4	Baylor	9	7	.563	15	12	.556
4	5	Houston	9	7	.563	16	12	.571
6	6	Texas A&M	6	10	.375	13	15	.464
7	-	SMU	4	12	.250	11	15	.423
8	-	Rice	3	13	.188	9	17	.346
9	-	TCU	1	15	.063	6	22	.214

== Tournament ==
First round Monday, March 5
4	Baylor	55
5	Houston	63
3	Arkansas	75
6	Texas A&M	65

Semifinals; Thursday, March 8
1	Texas	96
5	Houston	76
2	Texas Tech	56
3	Arkansas	43

Finals; Saturday, March 10
1	Texas	83
2	Texas Tech	73
