= 1996 Southwest Conference women's basketball tournament =

1996 regional basketball tournament

- Classification: Division I
- Teams: 8
- Site: Moody Coliseum; Dallas, Texas
- Champions: Texas A&M (1st title)
- Winning coach: Candi Harvey (1st title)
- MVP: Alicia Thompson (Texas Tech)

1995–96 Southwest Conference women's basketball standings
	Conf.				Overall
Team	W		L	PCT	W		L	PCT
Texas	13	–	1	.929	21	–	9	.700
No. 9 Texas Tech	13	–	1	.929	27	–	5	.844
SMU	9	–	5	.643	19	–	11	.633
No. 25 Texas A&M†	8	–	6	.571	20	–	12	.625
Rice	6	–	8	.429	13	–	14	.481
Houston	4	–	10	.286	12	–	16	.429
Baylor	3	–	11	.214	11	–	19	.367
TCU	0	–	14	.000	2	–	25	.074
† 1996 SWC tournament winner Rankings from AP Poll

The 1996 Southwest Conference women's basketball tournament was held March 6–9, 1996, at Moody Coliseum in Dallas, Texas.

Number 4 seed Texas A&M defeated 2 seed Texas Tech 72–68 to win their first championship and receive the conference's automatic bid to the 1996 NCAA tournament.

Texas Tech, SMU, and Texas received at-large bids for the NCAA tournament.

== Format and seeding ==
The tournament consisted of an 8 team single-elimination tournament.

Place	Seed	Team	Conference			Overall		
Place	Seed	Team	W	L	%	W	L	%
1	1	Texas	13	1	.929	21	9	.700
1	2	Texas Tech	13	1	.929	27	5	.844
3	3	SMU	9	5	.643	19	11	.633
4	4	Texas A&M	8	6	.571	20	12	.625
5	5	Rice	6	8	.429	13	14	.481
6	6	Houston	4	10	.286	12	16	.429
7	7	Baylor	3	11	.214	11	19	.367
8	8	TCU	0	14	.000	2	25	.074

== Tournament ==
Quarterfinal; Wednesday, March 6
1	Texas	109
8	TCU	78
4	Texas A&M	91
5	Rice	63
3	SMU	76
6	Houston	81
2	Texas Tech	90
7	Baylor	79

Semifinals; Friday, March 8
1	Texas	61
4	Texas A&M	75
6	Houston	75
2	Texas Tech	77

Finals; Saturday, March 9
4	Texas A&M	72
2	Texas Tech	68
