= 1995 Southwest Conference women's basketball tournament =

- Classification: Division I
- Teams: 8
- Site: Moody Coliseum; Dallas, Texas
- Champions: Texas Tech (3rd title)
- Winning coach: Marsha Sharp (3rd title)
- MVP: Michi Atkins (Texas Tech)

1994–95 Southwest Conference women's basketball standings
	Conf.				Overall
Team	W		L	PCT	W		L	PCT
No. 5 Texas Tech†	13	–	1	.929	33	–	4	.892
SMU	9	–	5	.643	21	–	10	.677
Texas A&M	9	–	5	.643	21	–	9	.700
Houston	7	–	7	.500	14	–	14	.500
Rice	7	–	7	.500	11	–	16	.407
Texas	7	–	7	.500	12	–	16	.429
Baylor	4	–	10	.286	12	–	14	.462
TCU	0	–	14	.000	1	–	27	.036
† 1995 SWC tournament winner Rankings from AP Poll

The 1995 Southwest Conference women's basketball tournament was held March 8–11, 1995, at Moody Coliseum in Dallas, Texas.

Number 1 seed Texas Tech defeated 2 seed SMU 84–62 to win their 3rd championship and receive the conference's automatic bid to the 1995 NCAA tournament. Despite losing, SMU still received an at-large bid to the NCAA tournament.

== Format and seeding ==
The tournament consisted of an 8 team single-elimination tournament.

Place	Seed	Team	Conference			Overall		
Place	Seed	Team	W	L	%	W	L	%
1	1	Texas Tech	13	1	.929	33	4	.892
2	2	SMU	9	5	.643	21	10	.677
2	3	Texas A&M	9	5	.643	21	9	.700
4	4	Houston	7	7	.500	14	14	.500
4	5	Rice	7	7	.500	11	16	.407
4	6	Texas	7	7	.500	12	16	.429
7	7	Baylor	4	10	.286	12	14	.462
8	8	TCU	0	14	.000	1	27	.036

== Tournament ==
Quarterfinal; Wednesday, March 8
1	Texas Tech	87
8	TCU	36
4	Houston	77
5	Rice	48
3	Texas A&M	63
6	Texas	78
2	SMU	83
7	Baylor	68

Semifinals; Friday, March 10
1	Texas Tech	90
4	Houston	69
6	Texas	65
2	SMU	81

Finals; Saturday, March 11
1	Texas Tech	84
2	SMU	62
