= 1988 Southwest Conference women's basketball tournament =

Whomen basketball

- Classification: Division I
- Teams: 6
- Site: Moody Coliseum; Dallas, Texas
- Champions: Texas (6th title)
- Winning coach: Jody Conradt (6th title)
- MVP: Doreatha Cornwell (Texas)

1987–88 Southwest Conference women's basketball standings
	Conf.				Overall
Team	W		L	PCT	W		L	PCT
No. 4 Texas†	16	–	0	1.000	32	–	3	.914
Houston	12	–	4	.750	22	–	7	.759
Texas Tech	9	–	7	.563	17	–	13	.567
Arkansas	8	–	8	.500	13	–	15	.464
Texas A&M	8	–	8	.500	15	–	13	.536
SMU	6	–	10	.375	12	–	16	.429
Rice	5	–	11	.313	11	–	14	.440
TCU	5	–	11	.313	12	–	15	.444
Baylor	3	–	13	.188	10	–	20	.333
† 1988 SWC tournament winner Rankings from AP Poll

The 1988 Southwest Conference women's basketball tournament was held March 9–12, 1988, at Moody Coliseum in Dallas, Texas.

Number 1 seed Texas defeated 3 seed Texas Tech 88–61 to win their sixth championship and receive the conference's automatic bid to the 1988 NCAA tournament.

Houston received an at-large bid to the NCAA tournament.

== Format and seeding ==
The tournament consisted of a 6 team single-elimination tournament. The top two seeds had a bye to the Semifinals.

Place	Seed	Team	Conference			Overall		
Place	Seed	Team	W	L	%	W	L	%
1	1	Texas	16	0	1.000	32	3	.914
2	2	Houston	12	4	.750	22	7	.759
3	3	Texas Tech	9	7	.563	17	13	.567
4	4	Arkansas	8	8	.500	13	15	.464
4	5	Texas A&M	8	8	.500	15	13	.536
6	6	SMU	6	10	.375	12	16	.429
7	-	Rice	5	11	.313	11	14	.440
7	-	TCU	5	11	.313	12	15	.444
9	-	Baylor	3	13	.188	10	20	.333

== Tournament ==
Quarterfinal; Wednesday, March 9
4	Arkansas	58
5	Texas A&M	59
3	Texas Tech	60
6	SMU	49

Semifinals; Thursday, March 10
1	Texas	72
5	Texas A&M	56
2	Houston	59
3	Texas Tech	60

Finals; Saturday, March 12
1	Texas	88
3	Texas Tech	61
