= 1991 Southwest Conference women's basketball tournament =

- Classification: Division I
- Teams: 8
- Site: Moody Coliseum; Dallas, Texas
- Champions: Arkansas (1st title)
- Winning coach: John Sutherland (1st title)
- MVP: Amber Nicholas (Arkansas)

1990–91 Southwest Conference women's basketball standings
	Conf.				Overall
Team	W		L	PCT	W		L	PCT
No. 9 Arkansas†	15	–	1	.938	28	–	4	.875
No. 16 Texas	14	–	2	.875	21	–	9	.700
Texas Tech	12	–	4	.750	23	–	8	.742
Houston	10	–	6	.625	20	–	12	.625
Texas A&M	8	–	8	.500	14	–	14	.500
SMU	4	–	12	.250	9	–	19	.321
Rice	4	–	12	.250	10	–	18	.357
Baylor	3	–	13	.188	9	–	17	.346
TCU	2	–	14	.125	5	–	22	.185
† 1991 SWC tournament winner Rankings from AP Poll

The 1991 Southwest Conference women's basketball tournament was held March 6–9, 1991, at Moody Coliseum in Dallas, Texas.

Number 1 seed Arkansas defeated 3 seed Texas Tech 60–51 to win their 1st championship and receive the conference's automatic bid to the 1991 NCAA tournament.

Texas and Texas Tech received at-large bids to the NCAA tournament.

== Format and seeding ==
The tournament consisted of an 8 team single-elimination tournament.

Place	Seed	Team	Conference			Overall		
Place	Seed	Team	W	L	%	W	L	%
1	1	Arkansas	15	1	.938	28	4	.875
2	2	Texas	14	2	.875	21	9	.700
3	3	Texas Tech	12	4	.750	23	8	.742
4	4	Houston	10	6	.625	20	12	.625
5	5	Texas A&M	8	8	.500	14	14	.500
6	6	SMU	4	12	.250	9	19	.321
6	7	Rice	4	12	.250	10	18	.357
8	8	Baylor	3	13	.188	9	17	.346
9	-	TCU	2	14	.125	5	22	.185

== Tournament ==
Quarterfinal; Wednesday, March 6
1	Arkansas	108
8	Baylor	63
4	Houston	84
5	Texas A&M	68
3	Texas Tech	71
6	SMU	56
2	Texas	108
7	Rice	61

Semifinals; Thursday, March 7
1	Arkansas	83
4	Houston	77^{OT}
3	Texas Tech	63
2	Texas	61

Finals; Saturday, March 9
1	Arkansas	60
3	Texas Tech	51
