= Lone Star Showdown =

Traditional rivalry in varsity athletics competitions

Texas–Texas A&M

- Texas Longhorns Texas A&M Aggies
- Location: Texas
- First meeting: October 19, 1894 - football
- Latest meeting: November 28, 2025 - Football

Locations of Texas A&M and Texas

The Lone Star Showdown, known as the Cotton Holdings Lone Star Showdown for sponsorship reasons, is the traditional rivalry for all varsity men's and women's athletics competitions between the University of Texas at Austin and Texas A&M University. The name comes from Lone Star State, which is the nickname of the state of Texas. The "Lone Star Showdown" moniker was trademarked in 1996.

The schools are rivals in most major sports, and both universities boast large living alumni bases (over 665,000), along with a significant following from supporters throughout the state and nation.

Being the two oldest public universities in the State of Texas, the rivalry has a history dating back over a century, with the first competition taking place in football in 1894. Throughout the decades, the schools joined and switched conferences together, maintaining the rivalry through the Texas Intercollegiate Athletic Association (TIAA), Southwest Conference (SWC), and Big 12 Conference.

The football portion of the Lone Star Showdown ended in 2011 when Texas A&M moved to the Southeastern Conference (SEC). Texas and Texas A&M still competed regularly in other sports in non-conference play.

The State Farm Lone Star Showdown started in 2004 and was created to bring more attention to the rivalry in non-major sports. The Lone Star Showdown trophy was awarded to the winning school each year based on head-to-head matchup in each sport. The final episode of the annual competition occurred during the 2011–12 academic year.

In July 2021, Texas announced that it (along with rival Oklahoma) would join the SEC no later than the 2025–26 academic year. In February 2023, the Big 12 announced that Texas and Oklahoma had negotiated a combined $100 million early termination fee in order to leave for the SEC a year early. The Longhorns football team competed in the Big 12 through the 2023 season before moving to the SEC in 2024, with the football edition of the Lone Star Showdown scheduled to resume in November of that year.

== Game results ==
=== Football ===
| Texas victories | Texas A&M victories | Tie games |

| No. | Date | Location | Winning team | | Losing team | |
|---|---|---|---|---|---|---|
| 1 | October 19, 1894 | Austin | Texas | 38 | Texas A&M | 0 |
| 2 | October 22, 1898 | Austin | Texas | 48 | Texas A&M | 0 |
| 3 | November 4, 1899 | San Antonio | Texas | 6 | Texas A&M | 0 |
| 4 | October 27, 1900 | San Antonio | Texas | 5 | Texas A&M | 0 |
| 5 | November 29, 1900^{[t]} | Austin | Texas | 11 | Texas A&M | 0 |
| 6 | October 26, 1901 | San Antonio | Texas | 17 | Texas A&M | 0 |
| 7 | November 28, 1901^{[t]} | Austin | Texas | 32 | Texas A&M | 0 |
| 8 | October 25, 1902 | San Antonio | Tie | 0 | Tie | 0 |
| 9 | November 27, 1902^{[t]} | Austin | Texas A&M | 11 | Texas | 0 |
| 10 | November 29, 1903 | Austin | Texas | 29 | Texas A&M | 6 |
| 11 | November 24, 1904^{[t]} | Austin | Texas | 34 | Texas A&M | 6 |
| 12 | November 30, 1905^{[t]} | Austin | Texas | 27 | Texas A&M | 0 |
| 13 | November 29, 1906^{[t]} | Austin | Texas | 24 | Texas A&M | 0 |
| 14 | October 12, 1907 | Dallas | Tie | 0 | Tie | 0 |
| 15 | November 28, 1907^{[t]} | Austin | Texas | 11 | Texas A&M | 6 |
| 16 | November 9, 1908 | Houston | Texas | 24 | Texas A&M | 8 |
| 17 | November 29, 1908 | Austin | Texas | 28 | Texas A&M | 12 |
| 18 | November 8, 1909 | Houston | Texas A&M | 23 | Texas | 0 |
| 19 | November 25, 1909^{[t]} | Austin | Texas A&M | 5 | Texas | 0 |
| 20 | November 14, 1910 | Houston | Texas A&M | 14 | Texas | 8 |
| 21 | November 13, 1911 | Houston | Texas | 6 | Texas A&M | 0 |
| 22 | November 19, 1915 | College Station | Texas A&M | 13 | Texas | 0 |
| 23 | November 30, 1916^{[t]} | Austin | Texas | 21 | Texas A&M | 7 |
| 24 | November 20, 1917 | College Station | Texas A&M | 7 | Texas | 0 |
| 25 | November 28, 1918^{[t]} | Austin | Texas | 7 | Texas A&M | 0 |
| 26 | November 27, 1919^{[t]} | College Station | Texas A&M | 7 | Texas | 0 |
| 27 | November 25, 1920^{[t]} | Austin | Texas | 7 | Texas A&M | 3 |
| 28 | November 24, 1921^{[t]} | College Station | Tie | 0 | Tie | 0 |
| 29 | November 30, 1922^{[t]} | Austin | Texas A&M | 14 | Texas | 7 |
| 30 | November 29, 1923^{[t]} | College Station | Texas | 6 | Texas A&M | 0 |
| 31 | November 27, 1924^{[t]} | Austin | Texas | 7 | Texas A&M | 0 |
| 32 | November 26, 1925^{[t]} | College Station | Texas A&M | 28 | Texas | 0 |
| 33 | November 25, 1926^{[t]} | Austin | Texas | 14 | Texas A&M | 5 |
| 34 | November 24, 1927^{[t]} | College Station | Texas A&M | 28 | Texas | 7 |
| 35 | November 29, 1928^{[t]} | Austin | Texas | 19 | Texas A&M | 0 |
| 36 | November 28, 1929^{[t]} | College Station | Texas A&M | 13 | Texas | 0 |
| 37 | November 27, 1930^{[t]} | Austin | Texas | 26 | Texas A&M | 0 |
| 38 | November 26, 1931^{[t]} | College Station | Texas A&M | 7 | Texas | 6 |
| 39 | November 24, 1932^{[t]} | Austin | Texas | 21 | Texas A&M | 0 |
| 40 | November 30, 1933^{[t]} | College Station | Tie | 10 | Tie | 10 |
| 41 | November 29, 1934^{[t]} | Austin | Texas | 13 | Texas A&M | 0 |
| 42 | November 28, 1935^{[t]} | College Station | Texas A&M | 20 | Texas | 6 |
| 43 | November 26, 1936^{[t]} | Austin | Texas | 7 | Texas A&M | 0 |
| 44 | November 25, 1937^{[t]} | College Station | Texas A&M | 7 | Texas | 0 |
| 45 | November 24, 1938^{[t]} | Austin | Texas | 7 | Texas A&M | 6 |
| 46 | November 30, 1939 | College Station | #1 Texas A&M | 20 | Texas | 0 |
| 47 | November 28, 1940 | Austin | Texas | 7 | Texas A&M | 0 |
| 48 | November 27, 1941^{[t]} | College Station | #10 Texas | 23 | #2 Texas A&M | 0 |
| 49 | November 26, 1942^{[t]} | Austin | #18 Texas | 12 | Texas A&M | 6 |
| 50 | November 25, 1943^{[t]} | College Station | #12 Texas | 27 | #16 Texas A&M | 13 |
| 51 | November 30, 1944 | Austin | Texas | 6 | Texas A&M | 0 |
| 52 | November 29, 1945 | College Station | #10 Texas | 20 | Texas A&M | 10 |
| 53 | November 28, 1946^{[t]} | Austin | #20 Texas | 24 | Texas A&M | 7 |
| 54 | November 27, 1947^{[t]} | College Station | #7 Texas | 32 | Texas A&M | 13 |
| 55 | November 25, 1948^{[t]} | Austin | Tie | 14 | Tie | 14 |
| 56 | November 24, 1949^{[t]} | College Station | Texas | 42 | Texas A&M | 14 |
| 57 | November 30, 1950 | Austin | #3 Texas | 17 | Texas A&M | 0 |
| 58 | November 29, 1951 | College Station | Texas A&M | 22 | #16 Texas | 21 |
| 59 | November 27, 1952^{[t]} | Austin | #10 Texas | 32 | Texas A&M | 12 |
| 60 | November 26, 1953^{[t]} | College Station | #7 Texas | 21 | Texas A&M | 12 |
| 61 | November 25, 1954^{[t]} | Austin | Texas | 22 | Texas A&M | 13 |

| No. | Date | Location | Winning team | | Losing team | |
|---|---|---|---|---|---|---|
| 62 | November 24, 1955^{[t]} | College Station | Texas | 21 | #8 Texas A&M | 6 |
| 63 | November 29, 1956 | Austin | #5 Texas A&M | 34 | Texas | 21 |
| 64 | November 28, 1957^{[t]} | College Station | Texas | 9 | #4 Texas A&M | 7 |
| 65 | November 27, 1958^{[t]} | Austin | Texas | 27 | Texas A&M | 0 |
| 66 | November 26, 1959^{[t]} | College Station | #4 Texas | 20 | Texas A&M | 17 |
| 67 | November 24, 1960^{[t]} | Austin | Texas | 21 | Texas A&M | 14 |
| 68 | November 23, 1961^{[t]} | College Station | #5 Texas | 25 | Texas A&M | 0 |
| 69 | November 22, 1962^{[t]} | Austin | #4 Texas | 13 | Texas A&M | 3 |
| 70 | November 28, 1963^{[t]} | College Station | #1 Texas | 15 | Texas A&M | 13 |
| 71 | November 26, 1964^{[t]} | Austin | #5 Texas | 26 | Texas A&M | 7 |
| 72 | November 25, 1965^{[t]} | College Station | Texas | 21 | Texas A&M | 17 |
| 73 | November 24, 1966^{[t]} | Austin | Texas | 22 | Texas A&M | 14 |
| 74 | November 23, 1967^{[t]} | College Station | Texas A&M | 10 | Texas | 7 |
| 75 | November 28, 1968^{[t]} | Austin | #6 Texas | 35 | Texas A&M | 14 |
| 76 | November 27, 1969^{[t]} | College Station | #1 Texas | 49 | Texas A&M | 12 |
| 77 | November 26, 1970^{[t]} | Austin | #1 Texas | 52 | Texas A&M | 14 |
| 78 | November 25, 1971^{[t]} | College Station | #12 Texas | 34 | Texas A&M | 14 |
| 79 | November 23, 1972^{[t]} | Austin | #7 Texas | 38 | Texas A&M | 3 |
| 80 | November 22, 1973^{[t]} | College Station | #11 Texas | 42 | Texas A&M | 13 |
| 81 | November 29, 1974 | Austin | #17 Texas | 32 | #8 Texas A&M | 3 |
| 82 | November 28, 1975 | College Station | #2 Texas A&M | 20 | #5 Texas | 10 |
| 83 | November 25, 1976^{[t]} | Austin | #11 Texas A&M | 27 | Texas | 3 |
| 84 | November 26, 1977 | College Station | #1 Texas | 57 | #12 Texas A&M | 28 |
| 85 | December 2, 1978 | Austin | #14 Texas | 22 | Texas A&M | 7 |
| 86 | December 1, 1979 | College Station | Texas A&M | 13 | #6 Texas | 7 |
| 87 | November 29, 1980 | Austin | Texas A&M | 24 | Texas | 14 |
| 88 | November 26, 1981^{[t]} | College Station | #7 Texas | 21 | Texas A&M | 13 |
| 89 | November 25, 1982^{[t]} | Austin | #14 Texas | 53 | Texas A&M | 16 |
| 90 | November 26, 1983 | College Station | #2 Texas | 45 | Texas A&M | 13 |
| 91 | December 1, 1984 | Austin | Texas A&M | 37 | #13 Texas | 12 |
| 92 | November 28, 1985^{[t]} | College Station | #15 Texas A&M | 42 | #18 Texas | 10 |
| 93 | November 27, 1986^{[t]} | Austin | #10 Texas A&M | 16 | Texas | 3 |
| 94 | November 26, 1987^{[t]} | College Station | #15 Texas A&M | 20 | Texas | 13 |
| 95 | November 24, 1988^{[t]} | Austin | Texas A&M | 28 | Texas | 24 |
| 96 | December 2, 1989 | College Station | #16 Texas A&M | 21 | Texas | 10 |
| 97 | December 1, 1990 | Austin | #5 Texas | 28 | Texas A&M | 27 |
| 98 | November 28, 1991^{[t]} | College Station | #10 Texas A&M | 31 | Texas | 14 |
| 99 | November 26, 1992^{[t]} | Austin | #4 Texas A&M | 34 | Texas | 13 |
| 100 | November 25, 1993^{[t]} | College Station | #8 Texas A&M | 18 | Texas | 9 |
| 101 | November 5, 1994 | Austin | #11 Texas A&M | 34 | Texas | 10 |
| 102 | December 2, 1995 | College Station | #9 Texas | 16 | #16 Texas A&M | 6 |
| 103 | November 29, 1996 | Austin | Texas | 51 | Texas A&M | 15 |
| 104 | November 28, 1997 | College Station | #15 Texas A&M | 27 | Texas | 16 |
| 105 | November 27, 1998 | Austin | Texas | 26 | #6 Texas A&M | 24 |
| 106 | November 26, 1999 | College Station | #24 Texas A&M | 20 | #7 Texas | 16 |
| 107 | November 24, 2000 | Austin | #12 Texas | 43 | #22 Texas A&M | 17 |
| 108 | November 23, 2001 | College Station | #5 Texas | 21 | Texas A&M | 7 |
| 109 | November 29, 2002 | Austin | #10 Texas | 50 | Texas A&M | 20 |
| 110 | November 28, 2003 | College Station | #6 Texas | 46 | Texas A&M | 15 |
| 111 | November 26, 2004 | Austin | #5 Texas | 26 | #22 Texas A&M | 13 |
| 112 | November 25, 2005 | College Station | #2 Texas | 40 | Texas A&M | 29 |
| 113 | November 24, 2006 | Austin | Texas A&M | 12 | #11 Texas | 7 |
| 114 | November 23, 2007 | College Station | Texas A&M | 38 | #14 Texas | 30 |
| 115 | November 27, 2008^{[t]} | Austin | #4 Texas | 49 | Texas A&M | 9 |
| 116 | November 26, 2009^{[t]} | College Station | #3 Texas | 49 | Texas A&M | 39 |
| 117 | November 25, 2010^{[t]} | Austin | #17 Texas A&M | 24 | Texas | 17 |
| 118 | November 24, 2011^{[t]} | College Station | #25 Texas | 27 | Texas A&M | 25 |
| 119 | November 30, 2024 | College Station | #3 Texas | 17 | #20 Texas A&M | 7 |
| 120 | November 28, 2025 | Austin | #16 Texas | 27 | #3 Texas A&M | 17 |
Series: Texas leads 78–37–5
^{[t]} Thanksgiving Day game

=== Results by location ===
As of November 28, 2025

| City | Games | Texas victories | Texas A&M victories | Ties | Years played |
|---|---|---|---|---|---|
| Austin | 61 | 47 | 13 | 1 | 1894–2010, 2025–present |
| College Station | 50 | 26 | 22 | 2 | 1915–2011, 2024–present |
| Houston | 4 | 2 | 2 | 0 | 1908–1911 |
| San Antonio | 4 | 3 | 0 | 1 | 1899–1902 |
| Dallas | 1 | 0 | 0 | 1 | 1907 |

=== Baseball ===
Texas–Texas A&M
- Texas A&M Aggies Texas Longhorns
- Sport: Baseball
- First meeting: April 24, 1903; Texas 6, Texas A&M 2
- Latest meeting: April 11, 2026; Texas A&M 11, Texas 5

Statistics
- Total meetings: 386
- All-time series: Texas leads, 248–133–5
- Largest victory: Texas A&M, 25–6 (April 30, 1995)
- Longest win streak: Texas, 15 (May 11, 1944 - April 21, 1949)
- Current win streak: Texas A&M, 2

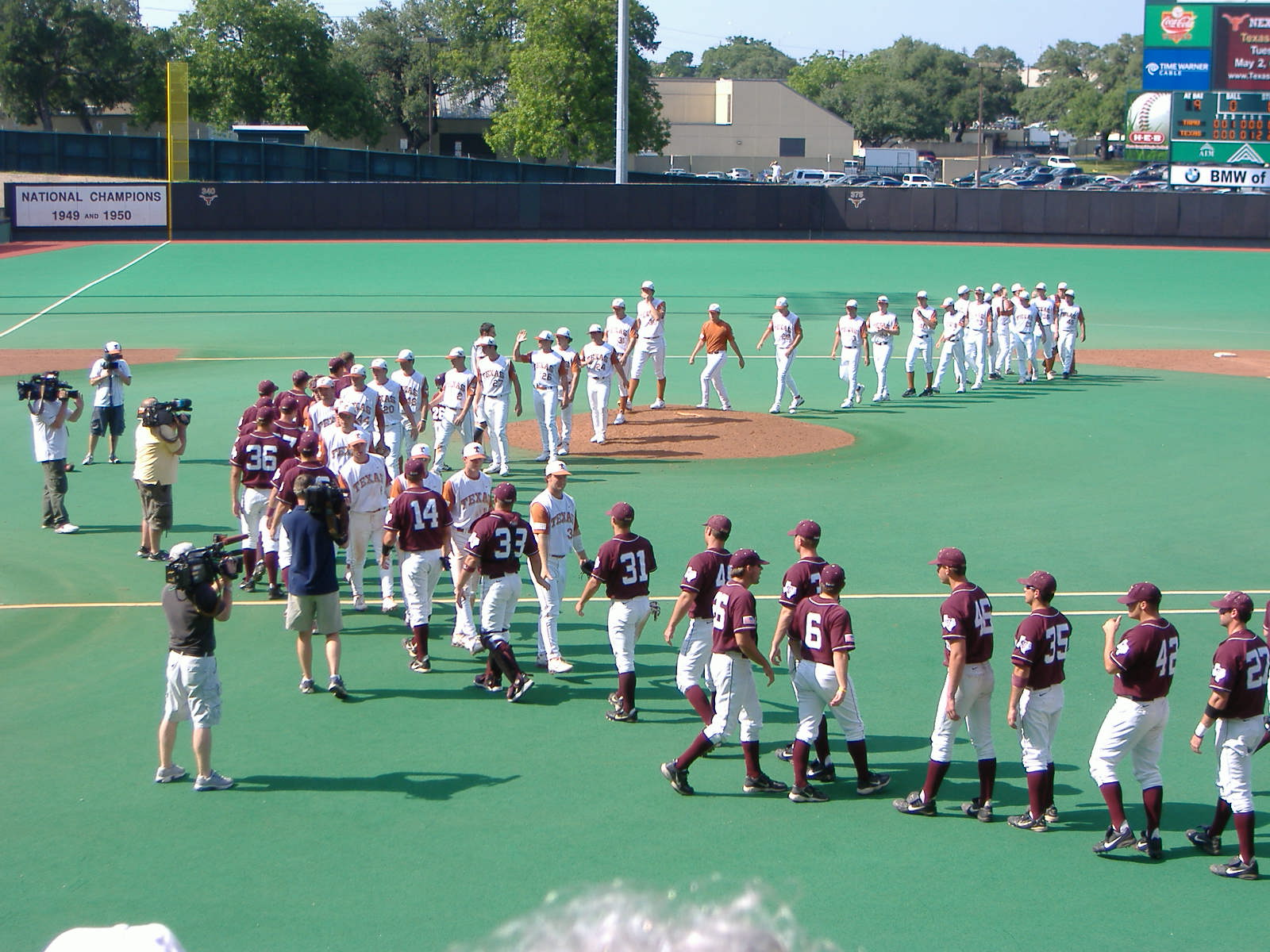
After a baseball game

| Texas victories | Texas A&M victories | Tie games |

| No. | Date | Location | Winner | Score |
|---|---|---|---|---|
| 1 | April 24, 1903 | College Station | Texas | 6–2 |
| 2 | April 25, 1903 | College Station | Texas | 7–1 |
| 3 | April 1, 1904 | Austin | Texas | 8–4 |
| 4 | April 14, 1905 | College Station | Texas | 5–4 |
| 5 | April 15, 1905 | College Station | Texas | 14–7 |
| 6 | May 5, 1905 | Austin | Texas A&M | 1–0 |
| 7 | April 27, 1906 | College Station | Texas A&M | 9–0 |
| 8 | April 28, 1906 | College Station | Texas A&M | 2–0 |
| 9 | May 11, 1906 | Austin | Texas | 6–5 |
| 10 | May 12, 1906 | Austin | Texas | 2–1 |
| 11 | April 5, 1907 | College Station | Texas | 2–1 |
| 12 | April 6, 1907 | College Station | Texas A&M | 8–1 |
| 13 | May 11, 1907 | Austin | Texas | 7–3 |
| 14 | May 11, 1907 | Austin | Texas | 2–1 |
| 15 | April 18, 1908 | College Station | Texas A&M | 7–0 |
| 16 | April 18, 1908 | College Station | Texas | 1–0 |
| 17 | May 1, 1908 | Austin | Texas | 5–4 |
| 18 | May 2, 1908 | Austin | Texas | 6–4 |
| 19 | May 2, 1908 | Austin | Texas | 1–0 |
| 20 | April 23, 1909 | College Station | Texas A&M | 5–4 |
| 21 | April 24, 1909 | College Station | Texas A&M | 2–0 |
| 22 | May 3, 1909 | Austin | Texas | 11–5 |
| 23 | May 4, 1909 | Austin | Texas A&M | 2–0 |
| 24 | March 6, 1911 | College Station | Texas A&M | 13–6 |
| 25 | May 3, 1911 | Austin | Texas | 5–1 |
| 26 | May 3, 1911 | Austin | Tie | 1–1 |
| 27 | April 21, 1915 | College Station | Texas A&M | 4–3 |
| 28 | April 22, 1915 | College Station | Texas A&M | 4–0 |
| 29 | May 4, 1915 | Austin | Texas | 3–2 |
| 30 | May 5, 1915 | Austin | Texas | 8–2 |
| 31 | April 13, 1916 | College Station | Texas | 8–2 |
| 32 | April 14, 1916 | College Station | Texas A&M | 3–0 |
| 33 | May 15, 1916 | Austin | Texas A&M | 2–1 |
| 34 | May 16, 1916 | Austin | Texas | 11–8 |
| 35 | April 12, 1917 | College Station | Texas | 9–5 |
| 36 | April 13, 1917 | College Station | Texas A&M | 4–1 |
| 37 | April 16, 1917 | Austin | Texas | 8–5 |
| 38 | April 17, 1917 | Austin | Texas | 5–2 |
| 39 | April 18, 1918 | College Station | Texas A&M | 1–0 |
| 40 | April 19, 1918 | College Station | Texas | 5–3 |
| 41 | May 10, 1918 | Austin | Texas | 2–1 |
| 42 | May 11, 1918 | Austin | Texas | 7–6 |
| 43 | April 14, 1919 | Austin | Texas | 6–1 |
| 44 | April 15, 1919 | Austin | Texas | 10–2 |
| 45 | May 12, 1919 | College Station | Texas | 1–0 |
| 46 | May 13, 1919 | College Station | Texas | 11–3 |
| 47 | April 12, 1920 | College Station | Texas | 14–5 |
| 48 | April 13, 1920 | College Station | Texas | 5–0 |
| 49 | May 14, 1920 | Austin | Texas | 2–0 |
| 50 | April 15, 1921 | Austin | Texas | 2–0 |
| 51 | April 16, 1921 | Austin | Texas A&M | 20–8 |
| 52 | May 13, 1921 | College Station | Texas | 10–6 |
| 53 | May 14, 1921 | College Station | Texas A&M | 9–3 |
| 54 | April 14, 1922 | College Station | Texas | 11–7 |
| 55 | April 15, 1922 | College Station | Texas | 7–6 |
| 56 | May 12, 1922 | Austin | Texas A&M | 6–5 |
| 57 | May 13, 1922 | Austin | Texas | 8–6 |
| 58 | April 16, 1923 | Austin | Texas A&M | 8–5 |
| 59 | April 17, 1923 | Austin | Texas A&M | 3–2 |
| 60 | May 11, 1923 | College Station | Texas A&M | 6–5 |
| 61 | May 12, 1923 | College Station | Texas | 7–6 |
| 62 | April 11, 1924 | College Station | Texas | 3–1 |
| 63 | April 12, 1924 | College Station | Texas | 18–1 |
| 64 | May 16, 1924 | Austin | Texas | 15–1 |
| 65 | May 17, 1924 | Austin | Texas | 4–3 |
| 66 | April 25, 1925 | Austin | Texas | 5–1 |
| 67 | May 22, 1925 | College Station | Texas | 7–3 |
| 68 | May 10, 1926 | College Station | Texas | 7–6 |
| 69 | May 22, 1926 | Austin | Texas A&M | 9–1 |
| 70 | April 22, 1927 | Austin | Texas | 10–4 |
| 71 | April 23, 1927 | Austin | Texas | 5–3 |
| 72 | May 20, 1927 | College Station | Texas | 2–1 |
| 73 | May 21, 1927 | College Station | Texas A&M | 3–0 |
| 74 | April 20, 1928 | College Station | Texas | 12–10 |
| 75 | April 21, 1928 | College Station | Texas | 4–2 |
| 76 | May 22, 1928 | Austin | Texas | 14–1 |
| 77 | May 22, 1928 | Austin | Texas | 5–4 |
| 78 | April 12, 1929 | Austin | Tie | 2–2 |
| 79 | April 13, 1929 | Austin | Texas A&M | 2–0 |
| 80 | April 13, 1929 | Austin | Texas | 7–3 |
| 81 | May 21, 1929 | College Station | Texas | 3–1 |
| 82 | May 21, 1929 | College Station | Texas | 5–3 |
| 83 | April 22, 1930 | College Station | Texas | 10–8 |
| 84 | April 22, 1930 | College Station | Texas | 2–1 |
| 85 | May 20, 1930 | Austin | Texas | 3–2 |
| 86 | May 21, 1930 | Austin | Texas | 11–7 |
| 87 | April 18, 1931 | Austin | Texas | 8–0 |
| 88 | May 16, 1931 | College Station | Texas A&M | 8–6 |
| 89 | May 6, 1932 | College Station | Texas | 11–4 |
| 90 | May 7, 1932 | College Station | Texas | 9–5 |
| 91 | May 20, 1932 | Austin | Texas A&M | 12–9 |
| 92 | May 21, 1932 | Austin | Texas | 11–4 |
| 93 | April 28, 1933 | Austin | Texas | 13–7 |
| 94 | April 29, 1933 | Austin | Texas A&M | 7–5 |
| 95 | May 12, 1933 | College Station | Texas | 10–9 |
| 96 | May 13, 1933 | College Station | Texas A&M | 7–3 |
| 97 | May 18, 1933 | Brenham^{B} | Texas | 5–4^{(10)} |
| 98 | May 19, 1933 | Brenham^{B} | Texas | 5–3 |
| 99 | April 13, 1934 | College Station | Texas A&M | 7–4 |
| 100 | April 14, 1934 | College Station | Texas A&M | 7–5 |
| 101 | May 9, 1934 | Brenham^{B} | Texas | 6–1 |
| 102 | May 14, 1934 | Austin | Texas A&M | 5–1 |
| 103 | May 15, 1934 | Austin | Texas | 8–5 |
| 104 | April 4, 1935 | Austin | Texas | 1–0 |
| 105 | April 5, 1935 | Austin | Texas | 12–6 |
| 106 | May 8, 1935 | College Station | Texas A&M | 7–6 |
| 107 | May 9, 1935 | Austin | Texas | 10–1 |
| 108 | May 2, 1936 | College Station | Texas | 4–3 |
| 109 | May 13, 1936 | Brenham^{B} | Texas A&M | 5–4 |
| 110 | May 21, 1936 | Austin | Texas | 6–5 |
| 111 | April 17, 1937 | Austin | Texas | 7–2 |
| 112 | May 13, 1937 | Austin | Texas A&M | 5–3 |
| 113 | May 14, 1937 | Austin | Texas A&M | 5–4 |
| 114 | May 3, 1938 | College Station | Texas | 18–13 |
| 115 | May 20, 1938 | Austin | Texas A&M | 13–9 |
| 116 | May 21, 1938 | Austin | Texas | 12–7 |
| 117 | April 29, 1939 | Austin | Texas | 18–6 |
| 118 | May 15, 1939 | College Station | Texas | 18–3 |
| 119 | May 16, 1939 | College Station | Texas | 7–5 |
| 120 | May 18, 1939 | Brenham^{B} | Texas A&M | 7–4 |
| 121 | May 19, 1939 | Brenham^{B} | Texas | 7–2 |
| 122 | April 20, 1940 | College Station | Texas | 9–3 |
| 123 | May 17, 1940 | Austin | Texas | 19–6 |
| 124 | May 18, 1940 | Austin | Texas | 11–10 |
| 125 | May 16, 1941 | College Station | Texas A&M | 3–2 |
| 126 | May 17, 1941 | College Station | Texas A&M | 7–5 |
| 127 | May 19, 1941 | Austin | Texas | 3–2 |
| 128 | March 26, 1942 | College Station | Texas A&M | 4–1 |
| 129 | May 8, 1942 | Austin | Texas A&M | 8–4 |
| 130 | May 9, 1942 | Austin | Texas A&M | 5–4 |

| No. | Date | Location | Winner | Score |
|---|---|---|---|---|
| 131 | April 9, 1943 | Austin | Texas | 4–2 |
| 132 | April 10, 1943 | Austin | Texas A&M | 12–0 |
| 133 | April 30, 1943 | College Station | Texas A&M | 11–8 |
| 134 | May 1, 1943 | College Station | Texas | 8–2 |
| 135 | April 7, 1944 | College Station | Texas A&M | 12–8 |
| 136 | May 11, 1944 | Austin | Texas | 4–1 |
| 137 | May 12, 1944 | Austin | Texas | 6–5 |
| 138 | April 6, 1945 | Austin | Texas | 13–0 |
| 139 | May 18, 1945 | College Station | Texas | 4–3 |
| 140 | May 19, 1945 | College Station | Texas | 15–2 |
| 141 | May 4, 1946 | College Station | Texas | 2–1 |
| 142 | May 17, 1946 | Austin | Texas | 6–4 |
| 143 | May 18, 1946 | Austin | Texas | 7–0 |
| 144 | April 11, 1947 | Austin | Texas | 9–8 |
| 145 | May 14, 1947 | College Station | Texas | 6–5 |
| 146 | May 15, 1947 | College Station | Texas | 11–9 |
| 147 | April 2, 1948 | College Station | Texas | 5–4 |
| 148 | May 14, 1948 | Austin | Texas | 16–4 |
| 149 | May 15, 1948 | Austin | Texas | 3–2 |
| 150 | April 21, 1949 | Austin | Texas | 14–4 |
| 151 | May 13, 1949 | College Station | Texas A&M | 6–1 |
| 152 | May 14, 1949 | College Station | Texas | 6–1 |
| 153 | April 11, 1950 | College Station | Texas | 12–2 |
| 154 | May 17, 1950 | Austin | Texas | 5–0 |
| 155 | May 18, 1950 | Austin | Texas | 6–5 |
| 156 | April 21, 1951 | Austin | Texas | 14–10 |
| 157 | May 17, 1951 | College Station | Texas A&M | 4–2 |
| 158 | May 18, 1951 | College Station | Texas A&M | 4–1 |
| 159 | April 8, 1952 | College Station | Texas A&M | 13–8 |
| 160 | May 15, 1952 | Austin | Texas | 5–0 |
| 161 | May 16, 1952 | Austin | Texas A&M | 3–2 |
| 162 | March 26, 1953 | Austin | Texas | 9–0 |
| 163 | May 18, 1953 | College Station | Texas | 1–0 |
| 164 | May 18, 1953 | College Station | Texas | 4–1 |
| 165 | April 13, 1954 | College Station | Texas | 6–2 |
| 166 | May 6, 1954 | Austin | Texas | 3–2 |
| 167 | May 7, 1954 | Austin | Texas A&M | 5–4 |
| 168 | April 15, 1955 | College Station | Texas A&M | 13–1 |
| 169 | April 16, 1955 | College Station | Texas | 7–5 |
| 170 | May 17, 1955 | Austin | Texas A&M | 7–4 |
| 171 | April 20, 1956 | Austin | Texas A&M | 5–4 |
| 172 | April 21, 1956 | Austin | Texas | 5–4 |
| 173 | March 22, 1957 | College Station | Texas | 8–4 |
| 174 | May 14, 1957 | Austin | Texas | 5–1 |
| 175 | May 14, 1957 | Austin | Texas | 1–0 |
| 176 | April 12, 1958 | College Station | Texas | 12–1 |
| 177 | May 9, 1958 | Austin | Texas | 13–2 |
| 178 | May 10, 1958 | Austin | Texas | 4–0 |
| 179 | March 21, 1959 | Austin | Texas A&M | 7–6 |
| 180 | May 7, 1959 | College Station | Texas A&M | 3–1 |
| 181 | May 8, 1959 | College Station | Texas A&M | 4–2 |
| 182 | April 1, 1960 | College Station | Texas | 5–1 |
| 183 | May 13, 1960 | Austin | Texas | 5–2 |
| 184 | May 14, 1960 | Austin | Texas | 8–3 |
| 185 | March 17, 1961 | Austin | Tie | 6–6 |
| 186 | May 8, 1961 | Austin | Texas | 17–3 |
| 187 | May 12, 1961 | College Station | Texas A&M | 13–6 |
| 188 | May 13, 1961 | College Station | Texas | 15–5 |
| 189 | March 31, 1962 | College Station | Texas A&M | 4–3 |
| 190 | May 9, 1962 | Austin | Texas | 4–3 |
| 191 | May 10, 1962 | Austin | Texas | 11–10^{(10)} |
| 192 | March 16, 1963 | Austin | Tie | 6–6 |
| 193 | May 7, 1963 | Austin | Texas | 12–2 |
| 194 | May 10, 1963 | College Station | Texas A&M | 10–5 |
| 195 | May 11, 1963 | College Station | Texas | 4–2 |
| 196 | March 21, 1964 | College Station | Texas A&M | 5–2 |
| 197 | May 7, 1964 | Austin | Tie | 5–5 |
| 198 | May 8, 1964 | Austin | Texas | 3–2^{(7)} |
| 199 | May 8, 1964 | Austin | Texas A&M | 5–2 |
| 200 | March 13, 1965 | Austin | Texas A&M | 12–4 |
| 201 | May 7, 1965 | College Station | Texas | 5–1 |
| 202 | May 8, 1965 | College Station | Texas A&M | 6–5 |
| 203 | March 26, 1966 | College Station | Texas A&M | 9–0 |
| 204 | May 9, 1966 | Austin | Texas A&M | 9–5 |
| 205 | May 10, 1966 | Austin | Texas A&M | 8–6 |
| 206 | March 14, 1967 | Austin | Texas | 5–0 |
| 207 | May 5, 1967 | College Station | Texas A&M | 11–6 |
| 208 | May 6, 1967 | College Station | Texas | 5–1 |
| 209 | March 2, 1968 | College Station | Texas A&M | 1–0 |
| 210 | March 6, 1969 | College Station | Texas | 2–1 |
| 211 | May 6, 1969 | College Station | Texas A&M | 5–2 |
| 212 | May 7, 1970 | Austin | Texas A&M | 7–5 |
| 213 | May 7, 1970 | Austin | Texas | 8–0 |
| 214 | May 8, 1970 | Austin | Texas | 5–3 |
| 215 | May 3, 1971 | College Station | Texas | 9–6 |
| 216 | May 3, 1971 | College Station | Texas | 3–0 |
| 217 | May 4, 1971 | College Station | Texas | 10–9 |
| 218 | April 28, 1972 | Austin | Texas | 4–2 |
| 219 | April 28, 1972 | Austin | Texas A&M | 7–6 |
| 220 | April 29, 1972 | Austin | Texas | 10–6 |
| 221 | April 27, 1973 | College Station | Texas A&M | 1–0 |
| 222 | April 27, 1973 | College Station | Texas | 3–1 |
| 223 | April 28, 1973 | College Station | Texas | 6–4 |
| 224 | April 26, 1974 | Austin | Texas A&M | 11–5 |
| 225 | April 27, 1974 | Austin | Texas | 8–0 |
| 226 | April 27, 1974 | Austin | Texas | 4–3 |
| 227 | April 25, 1975 | College Station | Texas | 15–4 |
| 228 | April 26, 1975 | College Station | Texas | 11–1 |
| 229 | April 26, 1975 | College Station | Texas A&M | 9–8 |
| 230 | April 9, 1976 | Austin | Texas | 3–0 |
| 231 | April 10, 1976 | Austin | Texas A&M | 2–0 |
| 232 | April 10, 1976 | Austin | Texas | 8–2 |
| 233 | April 8, 1977 | College Station | Texas | 12–5 |
| 234 | April 9, 1977 | College Station | Texas A&M | 1–0 |
| 235 | April 9, 1977 | College Station | Texas A&M | 8–5 |
| 236 | May 22, 1977 | Austin^{$} | Texas | 9–5 |
| 237 | May 17, 1978 | Austin | Texas A&M | 5–4 |
| 238 | May 18, 1978 | Austin | Texas A&M | 1–0 |
| 239 | May 18, 1978 | Austin | Texas | 5–2 |
| 240 | May 5, 1979 | College Station | Texas A&M | 1–0 |
| 241 | May 6, 1979 | College Station | Texas | 3–2^{(10)} |
| 242 | May 6, 1979 | College Station | Texas | 3–0 |
| 243 | May 12, 1979 | Austin^{$} | Texas | 6–4 |
| 244 | April 18, 1980 | Austin | Texas | 5–1 |
| 245 | April 19, 1980 | Austin | Texas | 4–1 |
| 246 | April 19, 1980 | Austin | Texas A&M | 5–4^{(12)} |
| 247 | May 1, 1981 | College Station | Texas | 4–1 |
| 248 | May 2, 1981 | College Station | Texas A&M | 4–2 |
| 249 | May 2, 1981 | College Station | Texas A&M | 13–5 |
| 250 | March 19, 1982 | Austin | Texas | 11–2 |
| 251 | March 20, 1982 | Austin | Texas | 8–3 |
| 252 | March 20, 1982 | Austin | Texas | 16–2 |
| 253 | May 14, 1982 | College Station^{$} | Texas | 12–7 |
| 254 | May 6, 1983 | College Station | Texas | 13–4 |
| 255 | May 7, 1983 | College Station | Texas | 14–11 |
| 256 | May 7, 1983 | College Station | Texas | 3–0 |
| 257 | May 4, 1984 | Austin | Texas | 12–6 |
| 258 | May 5, 1984 | Austin | Texas A&M | 10–7 |
| 259 | May 5, 1984 | Austin | Texas | 13–6 |
| 260 | May 12, 1984 | Austin^{$} | Texas | 15–4 |

| No. | Date | Location | Winner | Score |
|---|---|---|---|---|
| 261 | May 13, 1984 | Austin^{$} | Texas | 9–5 |
| 262 | April 26, 1985 | College Station | Texas | 9–5 |
| 263 | April 27, 1985 | College Station | Texas | 9–2 |
| 264 | April 27, 1985 | College Station | Texas | 8–7 |
| 265 | April 25, 1986 | Austin | Texas | 3–1 |
| 266 | April 26, 1986 | Austin | Texas | 5–4 |
| 267 | April 26, 1986 | Austin | Texas | 16–11 |
| 268 | April 17, 1987 | College Station | Texas | 8–2 |
| 269 | April 18, 1987 | College Station | Texas | 10–9 |
| 270 | April 18, 1987 | College Station | Texas A&M | 10–3 |
| 271 | April 22, 1988 | Austin | Texas | 10–2 |
| 272 | April 23, 1988 | Austin | Texas | 1–0 |
| 273 | April 23, 1988 | Austin | Texas | 7–6 |
| 274 | May 21, 1988 | Fayetteville^{$} | Texas | 10–0 |
| 275 | May 22, 1988 | Fayetteville^{$} | Texas | 12–7 |
| 276 | April 15, 1989 | College Station | Texas | 6–2 |
| 277 | April 16, 1989 | College Station | Texas A&M | 18–14 |
| 278 | April 16, 1989 | College Station | Texas A&M | 8–5 |
| 279 | May 19, 1989 | College Station^{$} | Texas A&M | 15–6 |
| 280 | May 20, 1989 | College Station^{$} | Texas A&M | 5–4 |
| 281 | April 13, 1990 | Austin | Texas | 5–1 |
| 282 | April 14, 1990 | Austin | Texas A&M | 5–3 |
| 283 | April 14, 1990 | Austin | Texas | 2–1 |
| 284 | April 19, 1991 | College Station | Texas A&M | 4–1 |
| 285 | April 20, 1991 | College Station | Texas A&M | 8–4 |
| 286 | April 20, 1991 | College Station | Texas A&M | 6–5 |
| 287 | May 17, 1991 | College Station^{$} | Texas | 5–4 |
| 288 | March 20, 1992 | Austin | Texas A&M | 11–9^{(10)} |
| 289 | March 21, 1992 | Austin | Texas | 8–1 |
| 290 | March 21, 1992 | Austin | Texas | 13–2 |
| 291 | April 10, 1992 | College Station | Texas | 10–3 |
| 292 | April 11, 1992 | College Station | Texas | 5–4 |
| 293 | April 12, 1992 | College Station | Texas A&M | 11–5 |
| 294 | April 30, 1993 | College Station | Texas A&M | 6–2 |
| 295 | May 1, 1993 | Austin | Texas A&M | 9–1 |
| 296 | May 2, 1993 | Austin | Texas | 3–1 |
| 297 | May 13, 1993 | Austin^{$} | Texas | 21–7 |
| 298 | May 15, 1993 | Austin^{$} | Texas | 11–10 |
| 299 | March 18, 1994 | Austin | Texas | 2–1 |
| 300 | March 19, 1994 | College Station | Texas | 8–7 |
| 301 | March 20, 1994 | College Station | Texas | 20–7 |
| 302 | March 18, 1995 | Houston^{#} | Texas A&M | 9–5 |
| 303 | April 28, 1995 | College Station | Texas | 10–5 |
| 304 | April 29, 1995 | Austin | Texas | 16–11 |
| 305 | April 30, 1995 | Austin | Texas A&M | 25–6 |
| 306 | May 20, 1995 | College Station^{$} | Texas A&M | 11–6 |
| 307 | March 16, 1996 | Houston^{#} | Texas A&M | 8–4 |
| 308 | April 26, 1996 | Austin | Texas | 17–4 |
| 309 | April 27, 1996 | College Station | Texas | 11–7 |
| 310 | April 28, 1996 | College Station | Texas A&M | 11–10 |
| 311 | April 18, 1997 | College Station | Texas A&M | 6–3 |
| 312 | April 19, 1997 | Austin | Texas | 6–2 |
| 313 | April 20, 1997 | Austin | Texas | 9–4 |
| 314 | April 17, 1998 | Austin | Texas | 12–5 |
| 315 | April 18, 1998 | College Station | Texas A&M | 5–1 |
| 316 | April 19, 1998 | College Station | Texas A&M | 11–4 |
| 317 | April 30, 1999 | College Station | Texas | 18–6 |
| 318 | May 1, 1999 | Austin | Texas A&M | 10–6 |
| 319 | May 2, 1999 | Austin | Texas A&M | 10–1 |
| 320 | April 28, 2000 | Austin | Texas | 3–1 |
| 321 | April 29, 2000 | College Station | Texas | 7–2 |
| 322 | April 30, 2000 | College Station | Texas A&M | 4–2 |
| 323 | May 4, 2001 | College Station | Texas A&M | 4–3^{(11)} |
| 324 | May 5, 2001 | Austin | Texas | 8–1 |
| 325 | May 6, 2001 | Austin | Texas | 4–3 |
| 326 | May 16, 2001 | Oklahoma City^{*} | Texas A&M | 9–8 |
| 327 | May 17, 2002 | Austin | Texas | 5–1 |
| 328 | May 18, 2002 | College Station | Texas | 7–3 |
| 329 | May 19, 2002 | College Station | Texas | 7–4 |
| 330 | May 22, 2002 | Arlington^{*} | Texas A&M | 8–4 |
| 331 | May 24, 2002 | Arlington^{*} | Texas | 9–4 |
| 332 | May 16, 2003 | College Station | Texas A&M | 6–4 |
| 333 | May 17, 2003 | Austin | Texas | 3–0 |
| 334 | May 18, 2003 | Austin | Texas A&M | 4–1 |
| 335 | May 22, 2003 | Oklahoma City^{*} | Texas A&M | 3–2 |
| 336 | May 24, 2003 | Oklahoma City^{*} | Texas | 9–7 |
| 337 | May 24, 2003 | Oklahoma City^{*} | Texas | 13–4 |
| 338 | May 21, 2004 | Austin | Texas | 6–3 |
| 339 | May 22, 2004 | College Station | Texas | 12–9 |
| 340 | May 23, 2004 | College Station | Texas A&M | 7–1 |
| 341 | May 27, 2004 | Arlington^{*} | Texas | 13–6 |
| 342 | May 20, 2005 | College Station | Texas A&M | 8–7^{(10)} |
| 343 | May 21, 2005 | Austin | Texas | 2–1 |
| 344 | May 22, 2005 | Austin | Texas | 11–1^{(7)} |
| 345 | April 29, 2006 | College Station | Texas | 5–3 |
| 346 | April 30, 2006 | College Station | Texas | 6–5 |
| 347 | May 1, 2006 | Austin | Texas | 6–1 |
| 348 | May 18, 2007 | College Station | Texas | 6–4 |
| 349 | May 19, 2007 | Austin | Texas | 3–2 |
| 350 | May 20, 2007 | Austin | Texas | 9–1 |
| 351 | May 26, 2007 | Oklahoma City^{*} | Texas A&M | 7–3 |
| 352 | May 16, 2008 | Austin | Texas | 5–2 |
| 353 | May 17, 2008 | College Station | Texas | 5–2 |
| 354 | May 18, 2008 | College Station | Texas | 6–3 |
| 355 | May 22, 2008 | Oklahoma City^{*} | Texas | 15–9 |
| 356 | May 8, 2009 | College Station | Texas | 11–9^{(10)} |
| 357 | May 9, 2009 | Austin | Texas A&M | 3–0 |
| 358 | May 10, 2009 | Austin | Texas | 5–4 |
| 359 | April 16, 2010 | Austin | Texas | 4–3^{(11)} |
| 360 | April 17, 2010 | College Station | Texas | 14–0 |
| 361 | April 18, 2010 | College Station | Texas | 8–0 |
| 362 | May 19, 2011 | College Station | Texas | 4–2 |
| 363 | May 20, 2011 | Austin | Texas | 6–4 |
| 364 | May 21, 2011 | Austin | Texas A&M | 3–0 |
| 365 | April 27, 2012 | College Station | Texas A&M | 6–5 |
| 366 | April 28, 2012 | Austin | Texas A&M | 12–4 |
| 367 | April 29, 2012 | Austin | Texas | 2–1 |
| 368 | May 30, 2014 | Houston^{N} | Texas | 8–1 |
| 369 | June 1, 2014 | Houston^{N} | Texas A&M | 3–2 |
| 370 | June 2, 2014 | Houston^{N} | Texas | 4–1 |
| 371 | March 15, 2016 | College Station | Texas A&M | 5–4 |
| 372 | March 14, 2017 | Austin | Texas | 4–3 |
| 373 | April 10, 2018 | College Station | Texas A&M | 6–5 |
| 374 | June 2, 2018 | Austin^{N} | Texas | 8–3 |
| 375 | April 2, 2019 | Austin | Texas A&M | 9–6 |
| 376 | March 30, 2021 | College Station | Texas A&M | 2–0 |
| 377 | March 29, 2022 | Austin | Texas A&M | 12–9 |
| 378 | June 19, 2022 | Omaha^{C} | Texas A&M | 10–2 |
| 379 | March 28, 2023 | College Station | Texas | 5–2 |
| 380 | March 5, 2024 | Austin | Texas A&M | 9–2 |
| 381 | June 1, 2024 | College Station^{N} | Texas A&M | 4–2^{(11)} |
| 382 | April 25, 2025 | Austin | Texas | 2–1 |
| 383 | April 26, 2025 | Austin | Texas | 3–2 |
| 384 | April 27, 2025 | Austin | Texas | 6–5 |
| 385 | April 10, 2026 | College Station | Texas A&M | 9–8 |
| 386 | April 11, 2026 | College Station | Texas A&M | 11–4 |
Series: Texas leads 248–133–5
^{C} = College World Series, ^{N} = NCAA Regional, ^{$} = SWC tournament^{*} = Big 12 tournament, ^{B} = Brenham^{#} SWC First Pitch Tournament

=== Men's basketball ===
Texas–Texas A&M
- Texas A&M Aggies Texas Longhorns
- Sport: Men's Basketball
- First meeting: February 23, 1917; Texas 38, Texas A&M 16
- Latest meeting: February 28, 2026; Texas 76, Texas A&M 70

Statistics
- Total meetings: 229
- All-time series: Texas leads, 140–89
- Largest victory: Texas, 81–36 (February 23, 1944)
- Longest win streak: Texas, 16 (February 12, 1994 - January 30, 2001)
- Current win streak: Texas, 1

| Texas victories | Texas A&M victories | Tie games |

| No. | Date | Location | Winner | Score |
|---|---|---|---|---|
| 1 | February 23, 1917 | Austin | Texas | 38–16 |
| 2 | February 24, 1917 | Austin | Texas | 24–19 |
| 3 | February 26, 1917 | College Station | Texas A&M | 29–15 |
| 4 | February 27, 1917 | College Station | Texas | 24–16 |
| 5 | February 15, 1918 | College Station | Texas | 27–15 |
| 6 | February 19, 1918 | College Station | Texas A&M | 21–12 |
| 7 | February 21, 1918 | College Station^{#} | Texas A&M | 8–7 |
| 8 | February 22, 1918 | College Station | Texas | 17–12 |
| 9 | February 21, 1919 | College Station | Texas | 28–19 |
| 10 | February 22, 1919 | College Station | Texas A&M | 22–15 |
| 11 | February 28, 1919 | Austin | Texas A&M | 28–20 |
| 12 | March 1, 1919 | Austin | Texas | 22–15 |
| 13 | February 6, 1920 | Austin | Texas A&M | 16–15 |
| 14 | February 7, 1920 | Austin | Texas A&M | 15–8 |
| 15 | February 27, 1920 | College Station | Texas A&M | 27–9 |
| 16 | February 28, 1920 | College Station | Texas A&M | 17–13 |
| 17 | February 4, 1921 | College Station | Texas A&M | 23–5 |
| 18 | February 5, 1921 | College Station | Texas | 16–15 |
| 19 | March 1, 1921 | Austin | Texas | 16–13 |
| 20 | March 2, 1921 | Austin | Texas A&M | 18–13 |
| 21 | February 3, 1922 | Austin | Texas A&M | 20–17 |
| 22 | February 4, 1922 | Austin | Texas A&M | 25–16 |
| 23 | March 2, 1922 | College Station | Texas | 19–11 |
| 24 | March 3, 1922 | College Station | Texas A&M | 20–8 |
| 25 | February 2, 1923 | College Station | Texas A&M | 27–21 |
| 26 | February 3, 1923 | College Station | Texas A&M | 42–25 |
| 27 | March 5, 1923 | Austin | Texas A&M | 16–13 |
| 28 | March 6, 1923 | Austin | Texas | 18–12 |
| 29 | February 1, 1924 | Austin | Texas | 33–22 |
| 30 | February 2, 1924 | Austin | Texas | 27–16 |
| 31 | March 7, 1924 | College Station | Texas | 24–14 |
| 32 | March 8, 1924 | College Station | Texas | 17–11 |
| 33 | February 16, 1925 | College Station | Texas A&M | 21–14 |
| 34 | February 28, 1925 | Austin | Texas | 17–13 |
| 35 | February 12, 1926 | Austin | Texas | 35–27 |
| 36 | February 26, 1926 | College Station | Texas | 32–19 |
| 37 | January 29, 1927 | College Station | Texas A&M | 36–35 |
| 38 | February 26, 1927 | Austin | Texas | 39–27 |
| 39 | February 4, 1928 | Austin | Texas | 51–30 |
| 40 | March 3, 1928 | College Station | Texas | 30–20 |
| 41 | February 16, 1929 | College Station | Texas | 32–29 |
| 42 | March 2, 1929 | Austin | Texas | 42–31 |
| 43 | February 14, 1930 | Austin | Texas | 33–25 |
| 44 | March 1, 1930 | College Station | Texas A&M | 42–20 |
| 45 | February 7, 1931 | College Station | Texas A&M | 34–10 |
| 46 | February 28, 1931 | Austin | Texas | 29–28 |
| 47 | February 13, 1932 | Austin | Texas | 32–31 |
| 48 | March 5, 1932 | College Station | Texas A&M | 14–9 |
| 49 | January 21, 1933 | College Station | Texas | 38–31 |
| 50 | March 4, 1933 | Austin | Texas | 51–20 |
| 51 | January 18, 1934 | Austin | Texas A&M | 34–29 |
| 52 | March 3, 1934 | College Station | Texas | 27–25 |
| 53 | January 16, 1935 | College Station | Texas A&M | 41–40 |
| 54 | March 6, 1935 | Austin | Texas | 35–25 |
| 55 | February 22, 1936 | Austin | Texas | 43–29 |
| 56 | March 5, 1936 | College Station | Texas | 32–27 |
| 57 | January 13, 1937 | College Station | Texas | 23–14 |
| 58 | March 4, 1937 | Austin | Texas | 37–29 |
| 59 | February 19, 1938 | Austin | Texas | 35–27 |
| 60 | March 3, 1938 | College Station | Texas A&M | 31–26 |
| 61 | February 11, 1939 | College Station | Texas | 41–37 |
| 62 | March 2, 1939 | Austin | Texas | 66–32 |
| 63 | February 21, 1940 | Austin | Texas | 42–31 |
| 64 | March 2, 1940 | College Station | Texas A&M | 53–52 |
| 65 | February 27, 1941 | College Station | Texas | 42–22 |
| 66 | March 6, 1941 | Austin | Texas | 53–36 |
| 67 | January 10, 1942 | Austin | Texas | 46–32 |
| 68 | March 3, 1942 | College Station | Texas A&M | 46–42 |
| 69 | January 16, 1943 | College Station | Texas | 54–45 |
| 70 | March 3, 1943 | Austin | Texas | 57–55 |
| 71 | January 15, 1944 | Austin | Texas | 77–40 |
| 72 | February 23, 1944 | College Station | Texas | 81–36 |
| 73 | February 6, 1945 | College Station | Texas | 87–59 |
| 74 | February 17, 1945 | Austin | Texas | 70–35 |
| 75 | January 12, 1946 | Austin | Texas | 46–42 |
| 76 | February 6, 1946 | College Station | Texas A&M | 50–44 |
| 77 | February 3, 1947 | Austin | Texas | 61–41 |

| No. | Date | Location | Winner | Score |
|---|---|---|---|---|
| 78 | February 15, 1947 | College Station | Texas | 69–40 |
| 79 | January 17, 1948 | Austin | Texas | 69–48 |
| 80 | March 9, 1948 | College Station | Texas | 54–34 |
| 81 | February 5, 1949 | College Station | Texas | 50–41 |
| 82 | February 16, 1949 | Austin | Texas | 56–43 |
| 83 | January 14, 1950 | Austin | Texas | 48–46 |
| 84 | February 28, 1950 | College Station | Texas | 53–52 |
| 85 | January 31, 1951 | College Station | Texas A&M | 32–29 |
| 86 | February 27, 1951 | Austin | Texas | 42–40 |
| 87 | March 9, 1951 | College Station^{!} | Texas A&M | 45–33 |
| 88 | March 12, 1951 | Austin^{!} | Texas | 35–34 |
| 89 | March 13, 1951 | Austin^{!} | Texas A&M | 33–32 |
| 90 | December 28, 1951 | Dallas^{$} | Texas A&M | 52–51^{(OT)} |
| 91 | February 2, 1952 | Austin | Texas | 51–40 |
| 92 | February 23, 1952 | College Station | Texas | 38–34 |
| 93 | December 30, 1952 | Dallas^{$} | Texas | 58–54 |
| 94 | January 16, 1953 | College Station | Texas A&M | 51–42 |
| 95 | February 10, 1953 | Austin | Texas | 68–49 |
| 96 | January 12, 1954 | College Station | Texas | 49–46 |
| 97 | February 16, 1954 | Austin | Texas | 66–49 |
| 98 | December 27, 1954 | Houston^{$} | Texas A&M | 66–61 |
| 99 | February 12, 1955 | College Station | Texas | 80–76 |
| 100 | February 22, 1955 | Austin | Texas | 74–64 |
| 101 | January 13, 1956 | College Station | Texas A&M | 75–74 |
| 102 | February 28, 1956 | Austin | Texas | 98–70 |
| 103 | February 5, 1957 | College Station | Texas A&M | 69–67 |
| 104 | February 23, 1957 | Austin | Texas A&M | 61–55 |
| 105 | January 7, 1958 | College Station | Texas A&M | 71–50 |
| 106 | February 15, 1958 | Austin | Texas | 74–68 |
| 107 | January 16, 1959 | College Station | Texas A&M | 73–29 |
| 108 | February 24, 1959 | Austin | Texas A&M | 71–61 |
| 109 | December 29, 1959 | Houston^{$} | Texas A&M | 84–74 |
| 110 | January 15, 1960 | College Station | Texas A&M | 72–61 |
| 111 | February 16, 1960 | Austin | Texas | 79–62 |
| 112 | January 16, 1961 | Austin | Texas | 81–76 |
| 113 | February 24, 1961 | College Station | Texas A&M | 86–69 |
| 114 | January 15, 1962 | Austin | Texas | 64–57 |
| 115 | February 13, 1962 | College Station | Texas A&M | 54–48 |
| 116 | February 5, 1963 | College Station | Texas | 70–59 |
| 117 | February 19, 1963 | Austin | Texas | 83–73 |
| 118 | January 11, 1964 | Austin | Texas A&M | 65–60 |
| 119 | March 5, 1964 | College Station | Texas A&M | 65–63 |
| 120 | February 6, 1965 | College Station | Texas | 65–63 |
| 121 | February 27, 1965 | Austin | Texas | 86–71 |
| 122 | January 18, 1966 | Austin | Texas A&M | 64–57 |
| 123 | February 12, 1966 | College Station | Texas | 110–82 |
| 124 | January 17, 1967 | College Station | Texas A&M | 68–59 |
| 125 | February 25, 1967 | Austin | Texas | 72–58 |
| 126 | January 16, 1968 | Austin | Texas A&M | 88–87 |
| 127 | February 10, 1968 | College Station | Texas A&M | 117–105 |
| 128 | February 1, 1969 | Austin | Texas A&M | 65–57 |
| 129 | February 11, 1969 | College Station | Texas A&M | 70–69^{(OT)} |
| 130 | January 13, 1970 | Austin | Texas A&M | 87–81 |
| 131 | February 10, 1970 | College Station | Texas A&M | 79–70 |
| 132 | February 9, 1971 | Austin | Texas | 78–69 |
| 133 | February 23, 1971 | College Station | Texas A&M | 65–64 |
| 134 | February 8, 1972 | Austin | Texas | 80–71 |
| 135 | February 29, 1972 | College Station | Texas | 80–73 |
| 136 | January 23, 1973 | College Station | Texas A&M | 69–64 |
| 137 | February 17, 1973 | Austin | Texas | 71–68 |
| 138 | January 29, 1974 | Austin | Texas | 98–90 |
| 139 | February 23, 1974 | College Station | Texas | 88–81 |
| 140 | February 1, 1975 | Austin | Texas A&M | 80–74 |
| 141 | March 8, 1975 | College Station | Texas A&M | 74–63 |
| 142 | January 28, 1976 | Austin | Texas A&M | 72–60 |
| 143 | February 3, 1976 | College Station | Texas A&M | 85–69 |
| 144 | January 4, 1977 | College Station | Texas A&M | 68–59 |
| 145 | January 10, 1977 | Austin | Texas | 87–73 |
| 146 | January 23, 1978 | College Station | Texas | 79–77^{(OT)} |
| 147 | February 13, 1978 | Austin | Texas | 90–66 |
| 148 | January 22, 1979 | Austin | Texas | 89–66 |
| 149 | February 12, 1979 | College Station | Texas | 65–57 |
| 150 | January 26, 1980 | Austin | Texas A&M | 56–53 |
| 151 | February 16, 1980 | College Station | Texas A&M | 84–61 |
| 152 | January 26, 1981 | College Station | Texas | 67–63^{(OT)} |
| 153 | February 21, 1981 | Austin | Texas A&M | 108–79 |
| 154 | January 31, 1982 | Austin | Texas A&M | 71–69^{(OT)} |

| No. | Date | Location | Winner | Score |
|---|---|---|---|---|
| 155 | February 20, 1982 | College Station | Texas A&M | 91–70 |
| 156 | January 29, 1983 | Austin | Texas A&M | 64–52 |
| 157 | February 28, 1983 | College Station | Texas A&M | 96–59 |
| 158 | January 25, 1984 | College Station | Texas A&M | 68–52 |
| 159 | February 25, 1984 | Austin | Texas A&M | 72–57 |
| 160 | March 6, 1984 | College Station^{$} | Texas A&M | 75–54 |
| 161 | January 20, 1985 | Austin | Texas A&M | 66–61 |
| 162 | February 20, 1985 | College Station | Texas | 53–51 |
| 163 | January 15, 1986 | College Station | Texas A&M | 55–54 |
| 164 | February 15, 1986 | Austin | Texas | 58–47 |
| 165 | March 8, 1986 | Dallas^{$} | Texas A&M | 55–47 |
| 166 | January 13, 1987 | College Station | Texas A&M | 68–52 |
| 167 | February 11, 1987 | Austin | Texas A&M | 58–56 |
| 168 | January 31, 1988 | College Station | Texas | 52–49 |
| 169 | March 2, 1988 | Austin | Texas | 64–58 |
| 170 | February 1, 1989 | Austin | Texas | 85–80 |
| 171 | March 4, 1989 | College Station | Texas A&M | 106–89 |
| 172 | January 17, 1990 | Austin | Texas | 96–94 |
| 173 | February 18, 1990 | College Station | Texas | 79–73 |
| 174 | March 9, 1990 | Dallas^{$} | Texas | 92–84 |
| 175 | January 2, 1991 | Austin | Texas | 93–67 |
| 176 | February 3, 1991 | College Station | Texas | 83–74 |
| 177 | January 14, 1992 | College Station | Texas | 76–73 |
| 178 | March 8, 1992 | Austin | Texas | 88–69 |
| 179 | March 13, 1992 | Dallas^{$} | Texas | 88–69 |
| 180 | February 10, 1993 | Austin | Texas | 82–78 |
| 181 | February 22, 1993 | College Station | Texas A&M | 77–57 |
| 182 | January 12, 1994 | College Station | Texas A&M | 85–84 |
| 183 | February 12, 1994 | Austin | Texas | 85–68 |
| 184 | March 12, 1994 | Dallas^{$} | Texas | 87–62 |
| 185 | January 14, 1995 | Austin | Texas | 115–82 |
| 186 | February 11, 1995 | College Station | Texas | 98–88 |
| 187 | January 16, 1996 | College Station | Texas | 86–70 |
| 188 | February 14, 1996 | Austin | Texas | 69–50 |
| 189 | January 15, 1997 | College Station | Texas | 86–76^{(OT)} |
| 190 | February 25, 1997 | Austin | Texas | 68–57 |
| 191 | February 2, 1998 | College Station | Texas | 81–80 |
| 192 | February 14, 1998 | Austin | Texas | 87–74 |
| 193 | February 3, 1999 | Austin | Texas | 71–59 |
| 194 | February 20, 1999 | College Station | Texas | 63–54 |
| 195 | January 12, 2000 | College Station | Texas | 78–51 |
| 196 | February 26, 2000 | Austin | Texas | 85–58 |
| 197 | January 17, 2001 | College Station | Texas | 76–58 |
| 198 | January 30, 2001 | Austin | Texas | 81–61 |
| 199 | January 23, 2002 | Austin | Texas A&M | 80–74 |
| 200 | February 6, 2002 | College Station | Texas | 66–52 |
| 201 | January 18, 2003 | Austin | Texas | 89–61 |
| 202 | February 8, 2003 | College Station | Texas | 95–87 |
| 203 | January 31, 2004 | College Station | Texas | 69–59 |
| 204 | February 18, 2004 | Austin | Texas | 77–57 |
| 205 | January 12, 2005 | College Station | Texas A&M | 74–63 |
| 206 | February 16, 2005 | Austin | Texas | 75–40 |
| 207 | February 4, 2006 | Austin | Texas | 83–70 |
| 208 | March 1, 2006 | College Station | Texas A&M | 46–43 |
| 209 | March 11, 2006 | Dallas^{*} | Texas | 74–70 |
| 210 | February 5, 2007 | College Station | Texas A&M | 100–82 |
| 211 | February 28, 2007 | Austin | Texas | 98–96^{(2OT)} |
| 212 | January 30, 2008 | College Station | Texas A&M | 80–63 |
| 213 | February 18, 2008 | Austin | Texas | 77–50 |
| 214 | January 24, 2009 | Austin | Texas | 67–58 |
| 215 | February 16, 2009 | College Station | Texas A&M | 81–66 |
| 216 | January 16, 2010 | Austin | Texas | 72–67^{(OT)} |
| 217 | February 27, 2010 | College Station | Texas A&M | 74–58 |
| 218 | January 19, 2011 | Austin | Texas | 81–60 |
| 219 | January 31, 2011 | College Station | Texas | 69–49 |
| 220 | March 11, 2011 | Kansas City, MO^{*} | Texas | 70–58 |
| 221 | January 11, 2012 | Austin | Texas | 61–51 |
| 222 | February 6, 2012 | College Station | Texas | 70–68 |
| 223 | November 25, 2015 | Paradise Island, Bahamas^{@} | Texas A&M | 84–73 |
| 224 | December 8, 2019 | Fort Worth | Texas | 60–50 |
| 225 | January 4, 2025 | College Station | Texas A&M | 80–60 |
| 226 | January 25, 2025 | Austin | Texas | 70–69 |
| 227 | March 13, 2025 | Nashville, TN^{^} | Texas | 94–89^{(2OT)} |
| 228 | January 17, 2026 | Austin | Texas A&M | 74–70 |
| 229 | February 28, 2026 | College Station | Texas | 76–70 |
Series: Texas leads 140–89
^{#} = A&M forfeited, ^{!} = NCAA District Playoff, ^{$} = SWC tournament^{*} = Big 12 tournament, ^{^} SEC tournament, ^{@} Battle 4 Atlantis Championship

=== Women's basketball ===
Texas–Texas A&M
- Texas A&M Aggies Texas Longhorns
- Sport: Women's basketball
- First meeting: March 23, 1975; Texas 63, Texas A&M 62
- Latest meeting: January 18, 2026; Texas 80, Texas A&M 35

Statistics
- Total meetings: 88
- All-time series: Texas leads, 65–23
- Largest victory: Texas, 96–50 (February 10, 1987)
- Longest win streak: Texas, 27 (February 13, 1978 - February 2, 1991)
- Current win streak: Texas, 7

| Texas victories | Texas A&M victories | Tie games |

| No. | Date | Location | Winner | Score |
|---|---|---|---|---|
| 1 | March 23, 1975 | Canyon, TX^{%} | Texas | 63–62 |
| 2 | January 27, 1976 | Austin | Texas | 55–49 |
| 3 | February 3, 1976 | College Station | Texas | 43–42 |
| 4 | February 14, 1976 | Houston^{H} | Texas A&M | 58–54 |
| 5 | February 1, 1977 | Austin | Texas | 79–73 |
| 6 | February 22, 1977 | College Station | Texas | 80–74 |
| 7 | January 23, 1978 | College Station | Texas A&M | 59–52 |
| 8 | February 13, 1978 | Austin | Texas | 86–60 |
| 9 | March 2, 1978 | San Angelo, TX^{%} | Texas | 84–56 |
| 10 | January 22, 1979 | Austin | Texas | 75–41 |
| 11 | February 12, 1979 | College Station | Texas | 73–48 |
| 12 | January 26, 1980 | Austin | Texas | 78–46 |
| 13 | January 26, 1981 | College Station | Texas | 73–42 |
| 14 | February 8, 1982 | Austin | Texas | 93–53 |
| 15 | January 29, 1983 | Austin | Texas | 88–51 |
| 16 | February 28, 1983 | College Station | Texas | 88–57 |
| 17 | January 25, 1984 | College Station | Texas | 108–77 |
| 18 | February 20, 1984 | Austin | Texas | 105–60 |
| 19 | January 19, 1985 | Austin | Texas | 80–58 |
| 20 | February 20, 1985 | College Station | Texas | 101–73 |
| 21 | January 14, 1986 | College Station | Texas | 73–59 |
| 22 | February 15, 1986 | Austin | Texas | 77–64 |
| 23 | January 14, 1987 | College Station | Texas | 94–60 |
| 24 | February 10, 1987 | Austin | Texas | 96–50 |
| 25 | January 30, 1988 | College Station | Texas | 89–61 |
| 26 | March 1, 1988 | Austin | Texas | 79–57 |
| 27 | March 10, 1988 | Dallas^{$} | Texas | 72–56 |
| 28 | February 9, 1989 | Austin | Texas | 86–61 |
| 29 | March 4, 1989 | College Station | Texas | 78–70 |
| 30 | March 9, 1989 | Dallas^{$} | Texas | 74–59 |

| No. | Date | Location | Winner | Score |
|---|---|---|---|---|
| 31 | January 16, 1990 | Austin | Texas | 88–67 |
| 32 | February 16, 1990 | College Station | Texas | 95–70 |
| 33 | March 1, 1991 | Austin | Texas | 72–59 |
| 34 | February 2, 1991 | College Station | Texas | 74–65 |
| 35 | January 20, 1992 | Austin | Texas A&M | 74–73 |
| 36 | February 15, 1992 | College Station | Texas | 71–52 |
| 37 | February 6, 1993 | College Station | Texas | 79–63 |
| 38 | March 7, 1993 | Austin | Texas | 76–64 |
| 39 | January 11, 1994 | College Station | Texas A&M | 75–74 |
| 40 | February 9, 1994 | Austin | Texas | 81–69 |
| 41 | March 11, 1994 | Dallas^{$} | Texas | 80–75 |
| 42 | January 14, 1995 | College Station | Texas A&M | 75–61 |
| 43 | February 11, 1995 | Austin | Texas A&M | 86–79 |
| 44 | March 8, 1995 | Dallas^{$} | Texas | 78–63 |
| 45 | January 17, 1996 | Austin | Texas | 87–66 |
| 46 | February 14, 1996 | College Station | Texas | 80–78 |
| 47 | March 8, 1996 | Dallas^{$} | Texas A&M | 75–61 |
| 48 | January 15, 1997 | Austin | Texas | 100–63 |
| 49 | March 1, 1997 | College Station | Texas | 79–58 |
| 50 | February 7, 1998 | Austin | Texas | 79–66 |
| 51 | February 18, 1998 | College Station | Texas A&M | 86–68 |
| 52 | March 3, 1998 | Kansas City, MO^{*} | Texas A&M | 98–74 |
| 53 | January 30, 1999 | College Station | Texas | 78–74 |
| 54 | February 20, 1999 | Austin | Texas | 65–56 |
| 55 | February 8, 2000 | Austin | Texas | 82–54 |
| 56 | February 29, 2000 | College Station | Texas | 76–67 |
| 57 | March 7, 2000 | Kansas City, MO^{*} | Texas | 83–72 |
| 58 | January 3, 2001 | Austin | Texas | 62–49 |
| 59 | February 7, 2001 | College Station | Texas | 63–57 |
| 60 | February 2, 2002 | College Station | Texas A&M | 70–65 |

| No. | Date | Location | Winner | Score |
|---|---|---|---|---|
| 61 | February 23, 2002 | Austin | Texas | 91–63 |
| 62 | January 15, 2003 | College Station | Texas | 74–47 |
| 63 | February 2, 2003 | Austin | Texas | 76–50 |
| 64 | January 25, 2004 | College Station | Texas | 64–62 |
| 65 | February 11, 2004 | Austin | Texas | 66–55 |
| 66 | February 2, 2005 | Austin | Texas | 77–62 |
| 67 | March 2, 2005 | College Station | Texas | 69–57 |
| 68 | February 8, 2006 | Austin | Texas A&M | 73–53 |
| 69 | February 22, 2006 | College Station | Texas A&M | 79–67 |
| 70 | January 21, 2007 | Austin | Texas | 64–45 |
| 71 | February 28, 2007 | College Station | Texas A&M | 67–60 |
| 72 | February 9, 2008 | College Station | Texas A&M | 66–57 |
| 73 | February 24, 2008 | Austin | Texas A&M | 65–50 |
| 74 | January 28, 2009 | Austin | Texas A&M | 68–54 |
| 75 | February 21, 2009 | College Station | Texas A&M | 76–65 |
| 76 | January 9, 2010 | Austin | Texas A&M | 91–70 |
| 77 | February 20, 2010 | College Station | Texas A&M | 58–44 |
| 78 | March 12, 2010 | Kansas City, MO^{*} | Texas A&M | 77–64 |
| 79 | January 19, 2011 | College Station | Texas A&M | 80–65 |
| 80 | February 27, 2011 | Austin | Texas A&M | 68–65 |
| 81 | March 9, 2011 | Kansas City, MO^{*} | Texas A&M | 77–50 |
| 82 | January 11, 2012 | College Station | Texas | 76–71 |
| 83 | March 4, 2012 | Austin | Texas | 79–64 |
| 84 | November 29, 2013 | St. Thomas, Virgin Islands^{P} | Texas | 69–58 |
| 85 | December 21, 2014 | Little Rock, AR^{C} | #3 Texas | 67–65 |
| 86 | December 5, 2021 | College Station | #11 Texas | 76–60 |
| 87 | February 2, 2025 | College Station | #5 Texas | 70–50 |
| 88 | January 18, 2026 | Austin | #4 Texas | 80–35 |
Series: Texas leads 65–23
^{%} = Texas AIAW Tournament,^{$} = SWC tournament^{*} = Big 12 tournament, ^{H} = Houston Invitational^{P} = Paradise Jam, ^{C} = Big 12/SEC Challenge

=== Softball ===
Texas–Texas A&M
- Texas A&M Aggies Texas Longhorns
- Sport: Softball
- First meeting: April 12, 1997; Texas A&M 2, Texas 0
- Latest meeting: May 9, 2025; Texas A&M 14, Texas 2

Statistics
- Total meetings: 50
- All-time series: Texas, 26–24
- Largest victory: Texas A&M, 14–2 (May 9, 2025)
- Longest win streak: Texas, 6 (April 10, 1998 - March 29, 2000)
- Current win streak: Texas A&M, 1

| Texas victories | Texas A&M victories | Tie games |

| No. | Date | Location | Winner | Score |
|---|---|---|---|---|
| 1 | April 12, 1997 | College Station | Texas A&M | 2–0 |
| 2 | April 13, 1997 | Austin | Texas A&M | 9–0^{(6)} |
| 3 | May 3, 1997 | Oklahoma City^{*} | Texas A&M | 6–1 |
| 4 | April 10, 1998 | Austin | Texas | 4–0 |
| 5 | April 11, 1998 | College Station | Texas | 8–2 |
| 6 | April 2, 1999 | College Station | Texas | 1–0 |
| 7 | April 10, 1999 | Austin | Texas | 1–0 |
| 8 | May 13, 1999 | Oklahoma City^{*} | Texas | 6–0 |
| 9 | March 29, 2000 | College Station | Texas | 8–0 |
| 10 | April 26, 2000 | Austin | Texas A&M | 5–3 |
| 11 | April 4, 2001 | Austin | Texas A&M | 1–0 |
| 12 | April 25, 2001 | College Station | Texas A&M | 3–1 |
| 13 | April 3, 2002 | College Station | Texas | 2–0 |
| 14 | April 24, 2002 | Austin | Texas | 1–0 |
| 15 | May 3, 2002 | Oklahoma City^{*} | Texas | 2–1^{(8)} |
| 16 | May 18, 2002 | Norman^{N} | Texas A&M | 2–1 |
| 17 | April 9, 2003 | Austin | Texas | 1–0 |
| 18 | April 22, 2003 | College Station | Texas | 4–1 |

| No. | Date | Location | Winner | Score |
|---|---|---|---|---|
| 19 | April 7, 2004 | Austin | Texas A&M | 6–0 |
| 20 | April 28, 2004 | College Station | Texas A&M | 11–1^{(5)} |
| 21 | April 6, 2005 | Austin | Texas | 3–0 |
| 22 | April 27, 2005 | College Station | Texas A&M | 5–3 |
| 23 | March 19, 2006 | Fullerton, CA^{F} | Texas | 1–0 |
| 24 | April 5, 2006 | Austin | Texas A&M | 4–2 |
| 25 | April 26, 2006 | College Station | Texas | 1–0 |
| 26 | May 11, 2006 | Oklahoma City^{*} | Texas A&M | 5–0 |
| 27 | March 28, 2007 | Austin | Texas | 5–0 |
| 28 | March 25, 2007 | College Station | Texas A&M | 3–0 |
| 29 | April 9, 2008 | Austin | Texas A&M | 3–1 |
| 30 | April 30, 2008 | College Station | Texas A&M | 2–1 |
| 31 | May 10, 2008 | Oklahoma City^{*} | Texas A&M | 3–1 |
| 32 | April 1, 2009 | College Station | Texas | 5–3 |
| 33 | May 2, 2009 | Austin | Texas A&M | 6–1 |
| 34 | April 7, 2010 | College Station | Texas A&M | 1–0 |
| 35 | April 21, 2010 | Austin | Texas | 4–1 |
| 36 | April 6, 2011 | Austin | Texas | 4–3 |

| No. | Date | Location | Winner | Score |
|---|---|---|---|---|
| 37 | May 4, 2011 | College Station | Texas A&M | 5–1 |
| 38 | April 26, 2012 | College Station | Texas A&M | 9–0^{(6)} |
| 39 | April 28, 2012 | Austin | Texas | 7–6 |
| 40 | April 29, 2012 | Austin | Texas | 4–3 |
| 41 | May 20, 2016 | Lafayette, LA^{N} | Texas | 5–0 |
| 42 | May 21, 2016 | Lafayette, LA^{N} | Texas A&M | 9–3 |
| 43 | May 21, 2017 | College Station^{N} | Texas A&M | 3–1 |
| 44 | May 18, 2019 | Austin^{N} | Texas | 3–2^{(8)} |
| 45 | May 20, 2023 | Austin^{N} | Texas | 2–1 |
| 46 | May 21, 2023 | Austin^{N} | Texas | 11–5 |
| 47 | May 24, 2024 | Austin^{S} | Texas A&M | 6–5 |
| 48 | May 25, 2024 | Austin^{S} | Texas | 9–8^{(9)} |
| 49 | May 26, 2024 | Austin^{S} | Texas | 6–5 |
| 50 | May 9, 2025 | Athens, GA^{$} | Texas A&M | 14–2^{(5)} |
Series: Texas leads 26–24
^{S} = NCAA Super Regional, ^{N} = NCAA Regional, ^{*} = Big 12 tournament^{$} = SEC tournament, ^{F} = Fullerton Tournament

=== Women's volleyball ===
Texas–Texas A&M
- Texas A&M Aggies Texas Longhorns
- Sport: Volleyball
- First meeting: November 8, 1974; Texas 2, Texas A&M 0
- Latest meeting: October 23, 2024; Texas A&M 3, Texas 2

Statistics
- Total meetings: 6 or 7
- All-time series: Texas leads, 76–26
- Longest win streak: Texas, 20 (November 20, 1982 - October 9, 1991)
- Current win streak: Texas A&M, 1

| Texas victories | Texas A&M victories | Tie games |

| No. | Date | Location | Winner | Score |
|---|---|---|---|---|
| 1 | November 8, 1974 | Arlington, TX^{&} | Texas | 2–0 |
| 2 | October 24, 1975 | Denton, TX^{+} | Texas | 2–0 |
| 3 | November 8, 1975 | Arlington, TX^{&} | Texas | 2–0 |
| 4 | November 14, 1975 | Austin^{*} | Texas | 2–1 |
| 5 | October 16, 1976 | Huntsville, TX^{SH} | Texas A&M | 2–0 |
| 6 | November 12, 1977 | Arlington, TX^{*} | Texas A&M | 3–0 |
| 7 | November 18, 1977 | Austin^{!} | Texas A&M | 2–1 |
| 8 | October 13, 1978 | Houston^{@} | Texas A&M | 2–1 |
| 9 | October 25, 1978 | Austin | Texas A&M | 3–1 |
| 10 | November 9, 1978 | College Station | Texas A&M | 3–1 |
| 11 | September 18, 1979 | Austin | Texas A&M | 3–2 |
| 12 | October 3, 1979 | College Station | Texas | 3–1 |
| 13 | November 10, 1979 | Houston^{#} | Texas | 2–0 |
| 14 | November 10, 1979 | Houston | Texas | 2–0 |
| 15 | November 17, 1979 | Arlington, TX^{!} | Texas A&M | 2–0 |
| 16 | September 12, 1980 | College Station^{~} | Texas | 2–0 |
| 17 | September 13, 1980 | College Station^{~} | Texas | 3–2 |
| 18 | October 3, 1980 | Beaumont, TX^{L} | Texas | 2–0 |
| 19 | October 15, 1980 | Austin | Texas | 3–2 |
| 20 | November 8, 1980 | College Station^{*} | Texas | 2–0 |
| 21 | November 20, 1980 | Baton Rouge, LA^{!} | Texas | 2–0 |
| 22 | December 5, 1980 | Lubbock, TX^{SW} | Texas | 2–0 |
| 23 | December 6, 1980 | Lubbock, TX^{SW} | Texas | 3–2 |
| 24 | October 10, 1981 | Austin^{%} | Texas | 3–1 |
| 25 | October 31, 1981 | Austin^{SW} | Texas | 3–0 |
| 26 | October 13, 1982 | College Station | Texas A&M | 3–1 |
| 27 | November 20, 1982 | Austin | Texas | 3–1 |
| 28 | October 3, 1983 | Austin | Texas | 3–0 |
| 29 | October 9, 1983 | Baton Rouge, LA^{^} | Texas | 3–1 |
| 30 | November 16, 1983 | College Station | Texas | 3–0 |
| 31 | October 10, 1984 | College Station | Texas | 3–0 |
| 32 | November 14, 1984 | Austin | Texas | 3–0 |
| 33 | October 30, 1985 | Austin | Texas | 3–0 |
| 34 | November 20, 1985 | College Station | Texas | 3–2 |
| 35 | December 13, 1985 | Austin^{NR} | Texas | 3–0 |

| No. | Date | Location | Winner | Score |
|---|---|---|---|---|
| 36 | October 15, 1986 | College Station | Texas | 3–1 |
| 37 | November 20, 1986 | Austin | Texas | 3–0 |
| 38 | October 14, 1987 | Austin | Texas | 3–0 |
| 39 | November 18, 1987 | College Station | Texas | 3–0 |
| 40 | October 26, 1988 | College Station | Texas | 3–1 |
| 41 | November 16, 1988 | Austin | Texas | 3–0 |
| 42 | October 11, 1989 | Austin | Texas | 3–0 |
| 43 | November 14, 1989 | College Station | Texas | 3–0 |
| 44 | October 17, 1990 | College Station | Texas | 3–1 |
| 45 | November 15, 1990 | Austin | Texas | 3–2 |
| 46 | October 9, 1991 | Austin | Texas | 3–0 |
| 47 | October 30, 1991 | College Station | Texas A&M | 3–2 |
| 48 | October 7, 1992 | College Station | Texas | 3–0 |
| 49 | October 28, 1992 | Austin | Texas | 3–0 |
| 50 | November 21, 1992 | Austin^{SW} | Texas | 3–0 |
| 51 | September 15, 1993 | Austin | Texas | 3–0 |
| 52 | November 3, 1993 | College Station | Texas | 3–1 |
| 53 | December 4, 1993 | Austin^{N2} | Texas | 3–0 |
| 54 | September 14, 1994 | College Station | Texas | 3–2 |
| 55 | November 2, 1994 | Austin | Texas | 3–2 |
| 56 | November 18, 1994 | Houston^{SW} | Texas A&M | 3–1 |
| 57 | October 11, 1995 | College Station | Texas | 3–2 |
| 58 | November 8, 1995 | Austin | Texas | 3–1 |
| 59 | November 20, 1995 | Houston^{SW} | Texas | 3–0 |
| 60 | September 25, 1996 | College Station | Texas A&M | 3–0 |
| 61 | November 13, 1996 | Austin | Texas | 3–0 |
| 62 | September 24, 1997 | Austin | Texas | 3–2 |
| 63 | November 12, 1997 | College Station | Texas A&M | 3–0 |
| 64 | September 30, 1998 | College Station | Texas | 3–2 |
| 65 | October 21, 1998 | Austin | Texas | 3–0 |
| 66 | September 25, 1999 | Austin | Texas | 3–1 |
| 67 | October 27, 1999 | College Station | Texas A&M | 3–1 |
| 68 | October 18, 2000 | Austin | Texas A&M | 3–1 |
| 69 | November 25, 2000 | College Station | Texas A&M | 3–0 |
| 70 | October 6, 2001 | Austin | Texas A&M | 3–1 |

| No. | Date | Location | Winner | Score |
|---|---|---|---|---|
| 71 | November 21, 2001 | College Station | Texas A&M | 3–0 |
| 72 | December 1, 2001 | College Station^{N2} | Texas A&M | 3–0 |
| 73 | October 6, 2002 | Austin | Texas A&M | 3–1 |
| 74 | November 21, 2002 | College Station | Texas A&M | 3–0 |
| 75 | December 1, 2002 | College Station^{N2} | Texas A&M | 3–0 |
| 76 | October 1, 2003 | Austin | Texas | 3–2 |
| 77 | October 24, 2003 | College Station | Texas A&M | 3–0 |
| 78 | October 16, 2004 | College Station | Texas A&M | 3–1 |
| 79 | November 11, 2004 | Austin | Texas | 3–2 |
| 80 | October 5, 2005 | College Station | Texas | 3–2 |
| 81 | October 26, 2005 | Austin | Texas | 3–0 |
| 82 | October 13, 2006 | College Station | Texas | 3–1 |
| 83 | November 8, 2006 | Austin | Texas | 3–0 |
| 84 | October 3, 2007 | College Station | Texas | 3–0 |
| 85 | November 9, 2007 | Austin | Texas | 3–1 |
| 86 | October 15, 2008 | College Station | Texas | 3–1 |
| 87 | November 1, 2008 | Austin | Texas | 3–0 |
| 88 | September 30, 2009 | Austin | Texas | 3–0 |
| 89 | October 28, 2009 | College Station | Texas | 3–0 |
| 90 | December 11, 2009 | Omaha, NE^{NR} | Texas | 3–0 |
| 91 | September 16, 2010 | College Station | Texas A&M | 3–0 |
| 92 | November 24, 2010 | Austin | Texas | 3–0 |
| 93 | October 5, 2011 | Austin | Texas | 3–0 |
| 94 | November 23, 2011 | College Station | Texas | 3–0 |
| 95 | December 1, 2012 | Austin^{N2} | Texas | 3–1 |
| 96 | December 6, 2013 | Austin^{N2} | Texas | 3–1 |
| 97 | September 14, 2016 | Austin | Texas | 3–0 |
| 98 | September 13, 2017 | College Station | Texas | 3–0 |
| 99 | September 20, 2019 | Austin | Texas | 3–0 |
| 100 | November 30, 2023 | Austin^{N1} | Texas | 3–1 |
| 101 | September 27, 2024 | College Station | Texas | 3–1 |
| 102 | October 23, 2024 | Austin | Texas A&M | 3–2 |
Series: Texas leads 76–26
^{!} = AIAW Regional Championship, ^{@} = Houston Invitational^{#} = Houston Round Robin, ^{L} = Lamar Invitational^{%} = Longhorn Classic, ^{^} = LSU Invitational^{NR} = NCAA Regional, ^{N2} = NCAA Second Round, ^{N1} = NCAA First Round^{+} = North Texas State Invitational, ^{SH} = Sam Houston State Invitational^{SW} = SWC Tournament, ^{~} = Texas A&M Invitational^{*} = Texas AIAW Championship, ^{&} = UT Arlington Invitational

=== Women's soccer ===
Texas–Texas A&M
- Texas A&M Aggies Texas Longhorns
- Sport: Soccer
- First meeting: September 25, 1994; Texas A&M 2, Texas A&M 1 ^{2OT}
- Latest meeting: September 29, 2024; Texas 2, Texas A&M 0

Statistics
- Total meetings: 27
- All-time series: Texas A&M leads, 19–6–2
- Largest victory: Texas A&M, 6–0 (October 11, 1995) & (November 2, 2001)
- Longest win streak: Texas A&M, 12 (September 25, 1994 - November 1, 2002)
- Current win streak: Texas A&M, 1

| Texas victories | Texas A&M victories | Tie games |

| No. | Date | Location | Winner | Score |
|---|---|---|---|---|
| 1 | September 25, 1994 | College Station | Texas A&M | 2–1^{(2OT)} |
| 2 | October 11, 1995 | Austin | Texas A&M | 6–0 |
| 3 | November 3, 1995 | Dallas^{$} | Texas A&M | 3–0 |
| 4 | October 22, 1996 | College Station | Texas A&M | 4–0 |
| 5 | October 2, 1997 | Austin | Texas A&M | 4–1 |
| 6 | November 7, 1997 | San Antonio^{*} | Texas A&M | 3–1 |
| 7 | October 28, 1998 | College Station | Texas A&M | 2–0 |
| 8 | September 24, 1999 | Austin | Texas A&M | 5–0 |
| 9 | October 26, 2000 | College Station | Texas A&M | 2–1^{(OT)} |
| 10 | November 2, 2001 | Austin | Texas A&M | 6–0 |

| No. | Date | Location | Winner | Score |
|---|---|---|---|---|
| 11 | November 11, 2001 | San Antonio^{*} | Texas A&M | 1–0 |
| 12 | November 1, 2002 | College Station | Texas A&M | 2–1 |
| 13 | October 31, 2003 | Austin | Texas | 2–1^{(2OT)} |
| 14 | September 10, 2004 | College Station | Texas A&M | 3–1 |
| 15 | November 7, 2004 | San Antonio^{*} | Texas A&M | 3–0 |
| 16 | October 2, 2005 | Austin | Texas | 2–1 |
| 17 | October 27, 2006 | Austin | Texas | 1–0 |
| 18 | October 12, 2007 | College Station | Texas A&M | 2–0 |
| 19 | November 11, 2007 | San Antonio^{*} | Texas | 2–1 |
| 20 | November 17, 2007 | College Station^{#} | Texas | 3–2 |

| No. | Date | Location | Winner | Score |
|---|---|---|---|---|
| 21 | September 26, 2008 | Austin | Tie | 0–0^{(2OT)} |
| 22 | October 30, 2009 | College Station | Texas A&M | 4–0 |
| 23 | November 6, 2009 | San Antonio^{*} | Texas A&M | 5–1 |
| 24 | October 29, 2010 | Austin | Tie | 1–1^{(2OT)} |
| 25 | October 28, 2011 | Austin | Texas A&M | 3–1 |
| 26 | November 15, 2019 | College Station^{#} | Texas A&M | 4–1 |
| 27 | September 29, 2024 | Austin | Texas | 2–0 |
| 28 | October 2, 2025 | College Station | Texas A&M | 1–0 |
Series: Texas A&M leads 20–6–1
^{#} = NCAA tournament, ^{*} = Big 12 tournament^{$} = SWC Tournament

== State Farm Lone Star Showdown (2004–2012) ==
State Farm Lone Star Showdown
- Texas (6): Texas A&M (2)
| 2004–05; 2005–06; 2006–07; 2009–10; 2010–11; 2011–12 | 2007–08; 2008–09 |

The State Farm Lone Star Showdown started in 2004 and was created to bring more attention to the rivalry in non-major sports. The Lone Star Showdown trophy was awarded to the winning school each year based on head-to-head matchup in each sport. The final episode of the annual competition occurred during the 2011–12 academic year.

=== Point system ===
Points were awarded for all sports in which both schools maintained an intercollegiate team. Each sport was worth one point, which was awarded to the winner of the head-to-head matchup between the two teams. Each team received ½ point for a head-to-head matchup that ended in a tie. In baseball, the team that won the regular season three-game series was awarded one point (and in the rare event of a split caused by each team winning one of the first two games, and the third game being called on account of weather with the game tied or not played, each team would receive ½ point). In sports where the teams met twice during the season — softball, volleyball, and men's and women’s basketball — each contest was worth ½ point.

If the universities did not compete in head-to-head regular season competition, the team that placed higher at the Big 12 Conference Championship would earn the point, and a tie in Big 12 Conference Championship competition would result in the point being split between the two schools. In the sport of track and field, multi-school meets were not counted as head-to-head competition.

There were a total of 19 possible points in each of the annual competitions, with 10 points needed to win. When the competition ended in a 9½ to 9½ tie, the rules provided that the winner of the previous year would retain the title for the following year.

=== Series history and standings ===
| Season | | Baseball | Men's Basketball | Women's Basketball | Men's Cross Country | Women's Cross Country | Football | Men's Golf | Women's Golf | Soccer | Softball | Men's Swimming & Diving | Women's Swimming & Diving | Men's Tennis | Women's Tennis | Men's Indoor Track & Field | Women's Indoor Track & Field | Men's Outdoor Track & Field | Women's Outdoor Track & Field | Volleyball | Winner | Score |
|---|---|---|---|---|---|---|---|---|---|---|---|---|---|---|---|---|---|---|---|---|---|---|
| 2004-05 | Texas wins (points) | 2 (1) | 1 (0.5) | 2 (1) | 1 (1) | 0 (0) | 1 (1) | 1 (1) | 1 (1) | 0 (0) | 1 (0.5) | 1 (1) | 1 (1) | 0 (0) | 1 (1) | 1 (1) | 1 (1) | 1 (1) | 1 (1) | 1 (0.5) | Texas | 14.5–4.5 |
| 2004-05 | Texas A&M wins (points) | 1 (0) | 1 (0.5) | 0 (0) | 0 (0) | 1 (1) | 0 (0) | 0 (0) | 0 (0) | 1 (1) | 1 (0.5) | 0 (0) | 0 (0) | 1 (1) | 0 (0) | 0 (0) | 0 (0) | 0 (0) | 0 (0) | 1 (0.5) | Texas | 14.5–4.5 |
| 2005-06 | Texas wins (points) | 3 (1) | 1 (0.5) | 0 (0) | 1 (1) | 0 (0) | 1 (1) | 1 (1) | 0 (0) | 1 (1) | 1 (0.5) | 1 (1) | 1 (1) | 1 (1) | 0 (0) | 1 (1) | 1 (1) | 1 (1) | 1 (1) | 2 (1) | Texas | 14–5 |
| 2005-06 | Texas A&M wins (points) | 0 (0) | 1 (0.5) | 2 (1) | 0 (0) | 1 (1) | 0 (0) | 0 (0) | 1 (1) | 0 (0) | 1 (0.5) | 0 (0) | 0 (0) | 0 (0) | 1 (1) | 0 (0) | 0 (0) | 0 (0) | 0 (0) | 0 (0) | Texas | 14–5 |
| 2006-07 | Texas wins (points) | 3 (1) | 1 (0.5) | 1 (0.5) | 1 (1) | 0 (0) | 0 (0) | 0 (0) | 0 (0) | 1 (1) | 1 (0.5) | 1 (1) | 0 (0) | 1 (1) | 1 (1) | 1 (1) | 0 (0) | 1 (1) | 0 (0) | 2 (1) | Texas | 10.5–8.5 |
| 2006-07 | Texas A&M wins (points) | 0 (0) | 1 (0.5) | 1 (0.5) | 0 (0) | 1 (1) | 1 (1) | 1 (1) | 1 (1) | 0 (0) | 1 (0.5) | 0 (0) | 1 (1) | 0 (0) | 0 (0) | 0 (0) | 1 (1) | 0 (0) | 1 (1) | 0 (0) | Texas | 10.5–8.5 |
| 2007-08 | Texas wins (points) | 3 (1) | 1 (0.5) | 0 (0) | 1 (1) | 0 (0) | 0 (0) | 1 (1) | 0 (0) | 0 (0) | 0 (0) | 1 (1) | 0 (0) | 1 (1) | 1 (1) | 1 (1) | 0 (0) | 0 (0) | 0 (0) | 2 (1) | Texas A&M | 10.5–8.5 |
| 2007-08 | Texas A&M wins (points) | 0 (0) | 1 (0.5) | 2 (1) | 0 (0) | 1 (1) | 1 (1) | 0 (0) | 1 (1) | 1 (1) | 2 (1) | 0 (0) | 1 (1) | 0 (0) | 0 (0) | 0 (0) | 1 (1) | 1 (1) | 1 (1) | 0 (0) | Texas A&M | 10.5–8.5 |
| 2008-09 | Texas wins (points) | 2 (1) | 1 (0.5) | 0 (0) | 1 (1) | 0 (0) | 1 (1) | 0 (0) | 0 (0) | 0.5 (0.5) | 1 (0.5) | 1 (1) | 1 (1) | 0 (0) | 1 (1) | 1 (1) | 0 (0) | 0 (0) | 0 (0) | 2 (1) | Texas A&M^{†} | 9.5–9.5 |
| 2008-09 | Texas A&M wins (points) | 1 (0) | 1 (0.5) | 2 (1) | 0 (0) | 1 (1) | 0 (0) | 1 (1) | 1 (1) | 0.5 (0.5) | 1 (0.5) | 0 (0) | 0 (0) | 1 (1) | 0 (0) | 0 (0) | 1 (1) | 1 (1) | 1 (1) | 0 (0) | Texas A&M^{†} | 9.5–9.5 |
| 2009-10 | Texas wins (points) | 3 (1) | 1 (0.5) | 0 (0) | 1 (1) | 1 (1) | 1 (1) | 0 (0) | 0 (0) | 0 (0) | 1 (0.5) | 1 (1) | 1 (1) | 1 (1) | 1 (1) | 0 (0) | 0 (0) | 0 (0) | 0 (0) | 2 (1) | Texas | 10–9 |
| 2009-10 | Texas A&M wins (points) | 0 (0) | 1 (0.5) | 2 (1) | 0 (0) | 0 (0) | 0 (0) | 1 (1) | 1 (1) | 1 (1) | 1 (0.5) | 0 (0) | 0 (0) | 0 (0) | 0 (0) | 1 (1) | 1 (1) | 1 (1) | 1 (1) | 0 (0) | Texas | 10–9 |
| 2010-11 | Texas wins (points) | 2 (1) | 2 (1) | 0 (0) | 1 (1) | 1 (1) | 0 (0) | 0 (0) | 1 (1) | 0.5 (0.5) | 1 (0.5) | 1 (1) | 1 (1) | 0 (0) | 1 (1) | 0 (0) | 0 (0) | 0 (0) | 0 (0) | 1 (0.5) | Texas^{†} | 9.5–9.5 |
| 2010-11 | Texas A&M wins (points) | 1 (0) | 0 (0) | 2 (1) | 0 (0) | 0 (0) | 1 (1) | 1 (1) | 0 (0) | 0.5 (0.5) | 1 (0.5) | 0 (0) | 0 (0) | 1 (1) | 0 (0) | 1 (1) | 1 (1) | 1 (1) | 1 (1) | 1 (0.5) | Texas^{†} | 9.5–9.5 |
| 2011-12 | Texas wins (points) | 1 (0) | 2 (1) | 2 (1) | 1 (1) | 1 (1) | 1 (1) | 0 (0) | 1 (1) | 0 (0) | 2 (1) | 1 (1) | 1 (1) | 1 (1) | 0 (0) | 0 (0) | 0 (0) | 0 (0) | 1 (1) | 2 (1) | Texas | 12–7 |
| 2011-12 | Texas A&M wins (points) | 2 (1) | 0 (0) | 0 (0) | 0 (0) | 0 (0) | 0 (0) | 1 (1) | 0 (0) | 1 (1) | 1 (0) | 0 (0) | 0 (0) | 0 (0) | 1 (1) | 1 (1) | 1 (1) | 1 (1) | 0 (0) | 0 (0) | Texas | 12–7 |
| Season | | Baseball | Men's Basketball | Women's Basketball | Men's Cross Country | Women's Cross Country | Football | Men's Golf | Women's Golf | Soccer | Softball | Men's Swimming & Diving | Women's Swimming & Diving | Men's Tennis | Women's Tennis | Men's Indoor Track & Field | Women's Indoor Track & Field | Men's Outdoor Track & Field | Women's Outdoor Track & Field | Volleyball | Winner | Score |

^{†}Previous year's winner retains title in the event of a tie, as per the tie-breaker rule.

==== Overall results (2004–2012) ====
- Total wins: Texas 6 (63%), Texas A&M 2 (37%)
- Total points: Texas 90.5 (60%), Texas A&M 61.5 (40%)

=== State Farm Scholar-Athlete ===
Beginning with the 2006–07 school year, State Farm began honoring a member of the home team at each Showdown event as a State Farm Scholar-Athlete for their achievements both in competition and in the classroom.

2009–10 Honorees:

- Jon Wiegand, Texas, Tennis
- Loryn Johnson, Texas, Softball
- Elze Potgieter, Texas A&M, Tennis
- Michael Wacha, Texas A&M, Baseball
- Kendal Carillo, Texas, Baseball
- Kelsea Orsak, Texas A&M, Softball
- Nathan Walkup, Texas A&M, Basketball
- Damitria Buchanan, Texas A&M, Basketball
- Casey Strange, Texas A&M, Swimming & Diving
- Damion James, Texas, Basketball
- Justin Mason, Texas, Basketball
- Dexter Pittman, Texas, Basketball
- Kristen Nash, Texas, Basketball
- Ryan Tannehill, Texas A&M, Football
- Adrienne Woods, Texas, Swimming & Diving
- Rachel Shipley, Texas A&M, Soccer
- Jennifer Banse, Texas A&M, Volleyball
- Heather Kisner, Texas, Volleyball

2008–09 Honorees:

- Keith Shinaberry, Texas, Baseball
- Kyle Thebeau, Texas A&M, Baseball
- Erin Tresselt, Texas, Softball
- Conor Pollock, Texas A&M, Tennis
- Bailey Schroeder, Texas A&M, Softball
- Sarah Lancaster, Texas, Tennis
- La Toya Micheaux, Texas A&M, Basketball
- Josh Carter, Texas A&M, Basketball
- Scott Drews, Texas, Swimming & Diving
- Kathleen Nash, Texas, Basketball
- Stephanie Logterman, Texas, Soccer
- Mary Batis, Texas A&M, Volleyball
- Lauren Paolini, Texas, Volleyball
- Chris Ogbonnaya, Texas, Football
- Sarah Woods, Texas A&M, Women's Swimming & Diving
- Connor Atchley, Texas, Men's Basketball

2007–08 Honorees:

- Jen Moore, Texas A&M, Volleyball
- Elisabeth Jones, Texas A&M, Soccer
- Michelle Moriarty, Texas, Volleyball
- Stephen McGee, Texas A&M, Football
- Joseph Jones, Texas A&M, Men's Basketball
- Mary Yarrison, Texas, Women's Swimming & Diving
- Alejandro Jacobo, Texas A&M, Men's Swimming & Diving
- Morenike Atunrase, Texas A&M, Women's Basketball
- Connor Atchley, Texas, Men's Basketball
- Earnesia Williams, Texas, Women's Basketball
- Erin Tresselt, Texas, Softball
- Anna Blagodarova, Texas A&M, Women's Tennis

2006–07 Honorees:

- Karen Haight, Texas, Soccer
- Kristen Heiss, Texas A&M, Women's Swimming & Diving
- Michelle Moriarty, Texas, Volleyball
- Neale Tweedie, Texas, Football
- Earnesia Williams, Texas, Women's Basketball
- Tyler O'Halloran, Texas, Men's Swimming & Diving
- Acie Law IV, Texas A&M, Men's Basketball
- Katy Pounds, Texas A&M, Women's Basketball
- Craig Winder, Texas, Men's Basketball
- Kacie Gaskin, Texas, Softball
- Conor Pollock, Texas A&M, Men's Tennis
- Petra Dizdar, Texas, Women's Tennis
- Amanda Scarborough, Texas A&M, Softball
- Matt Ueckert, Texas A&M, Baseball
- Bradley Suttle, Texas, Baseball

== Cotton Holdings Lone Star Showdown (2024–present) ==
Cotton Holdings Lone Star Showdown
- Texas (1): Texas A&M (1)
| 2024–25 | 2025-26 |

In 2024, after Texas moved to the Southeastern Conference, the series was revived, with the same points format in place as the previous iteration.

=== Series history and standings ===
| Season | | Baseball | Men's Basketball | Women's Basketball | Men's Cross Country | Women's Cross Country | Football | Men's Golf | Women's Golf | Soccer | Softball | Men's Swimming & Diving | Women's Swimming & Diving | Men's Tennis | Women's Tennis | Men's Indoor Track & Field | Women's Indoor Track & Field | Men's Outdoor Track & Field | Women's Outdoor Track & Field | Volleyball | Winner | Score |
|---|---|---|---|---|---|---|---|---|---|---|---|---|---|---|---|---|---|---|---|---|---|---|
| 2024-25 | Texas wins (points) | 3 (1) | 1 (0.5) | 1 (1) | 1 (1) | 1 (1) | 1 (1) | 0 (0) | 1 (1) | 1 (1) | No meetings | 1 (1) | 1 (1) | 1 (1) | 0 (0) | 0 (0) | 0 (0) | 0 (0) | 0 (0) | 1 (0.5) | Texas | 11–7 |
| 2024-25 | Texas A&M wins (points) | 0 (0) | 1 (0.5) | 0 (0) | 0 (0) | 0 (0) | 0 (0) | 1 (1) | 0 (0) | 0 (0) | No meetings | 0 (0) | 0 (0) | 0 (0) | 1 (1) | 1 (1) | 1 (1) | 1 (1) | 1 (1) | 1 (0.5) | Texas | 11–7 |
| 2025-26 | Texas wins (points) | 0 (0) | 1 (0.5) | 1 (1) | 0 (0) | 0 (0) | 1 (1) | 1 (1) | 0 (0) | 0 (0) | 2 (1) | 1 (1) | 1 (1) | 1 (1) | 0 (0) | 0 (0) | 0 (0) | 0 (0) | 0 (0) | 0 (0) | Texas A&M | 11.5–7.5 |
| 2025-26 | Texas A&M wins (points) | 2 (1) | 1 (0.5) | 0 (0) | 1 (1) | 1 (1) | 0 (0) | 0 (0) | 1 (1) | 1 (1) | 1 (0) | 0 (0) | 0 (0) | 0 (0) | 1 (1) | 1 (1) | 1 (1) | 1 (1) | 1 (1) | 1 (1) | Texas A&M | 11.5–7.5 |
| Season | | Baseball | Men's Basketball | Women's Basketball | Men's Cross Country | Women's Cross Country | Football | Men's Golf | Women's Golf | Soccer | Softball | Men's Swimming & Diving | Women's Swimming & Diving | Men's Tennis | Women's Tennis | Men's Indoor Track & Field | Women's Indoor Track & Field | Men's Outdoor Track & Field | Women's Outdoor Track & Field | Volleyball | Winner | Score |

==== Overall results (2024–present) ====
- Total wins: Texas 1 (50%), Texas A&M 1 (50%)
- Total points: Texas 18.5 (50%), Texas A&M 18.5 (50%)

== 2020 Revival ==
In August 2020, it was announced that the rivalry would be revived in the name of supporting Feeding America. The event was set to take place on September 4 and coincide with the Annual College Colors Day. For each purchase of officially licensed Texas A&M or Texas merchandise, Wells Fargo would donate 100 meals to Feeding America member food banks.

== See also ==
- List of most-played college football series in NCAA Division I
- Texas–Texas A&M football rivalry
