= 1989 Southwest Conference women's basketball tournament =

Basketball tournament in Dallas, Texas

- Classification: Division I
- Teams: 6
- Site: Moody Coliseum; Dallas, Texas
- Champions: Texas (7th title)
- Winning coach: Jody Conradt (7th title)
- MVP: Clarissa Davis (Texas)

1988–89 Southwest Conference women's basketball standings
	Conf.				Overall
Team	W		L	PCT	W		L	PCT
No. 6 Texas†	16	–	0	1.000	28	–	5	.848
Arkansas	13	–	3	.813	22	–	8	.733
Texas Tech	9	–	7	.563	16	–	13	.552
Houston	9	–	7	.563	16	–	12	.571
Texas A&M	8	–	8	.500	17	–	12	.586
SMU	7	–	9	.438	11	–	14	.440
Rice	5	–	11	.313	14	–	14	.500
TCU	4	–	12	.250	9	–	16	.360
Baylor	1	–	15	.063	3	–	23	.115
† 1989 SWC tournament winner Rankings from AP Poll

The 1989 Southwest Conference women's basketball tournament was held March 8–11, 1989, at Moody Coliseum in Dallas, Texas.

Number 1 seed Texas defeated 2 seed Arkansas 101–99 to win their 7th championship and receive the conference's automatic bid to the 1989 NCAA tournament.

Despite the loss, Arkansas received an at-large bid to the NCAA tournament.

== Format and seeding ==
The tournament consisted of a 6 team single-elimination tournament. The top two seeds had a bye to the Semifinals.

Place	Seed	Team	Conference			Overall		
Place	Seed	Team	W	L	%	W	L	%
1	1	Texas	16	0	1.000	28	5	.848
2	2	Arkansas	13	3	.813	22	8	.733
3	3	Texas Tech	9	7	.563	16	13	.552
3	4	Houston	9	7	.563	16	12	.571
5	5	Texas A&M	8	8	.500	17	12	.586
6	6	SMU	7	9	.438	11	14	.440
7	-	Rice	5	11	.313	14	14	.500
8	-	TCU	4	12	.250	9	16	.360
9	-	Baylor	1	15	.063	3	23	.115

== Tournament ==
Quarterfinal; Wednesday, March 8
4	Houston	73
5	Texas A&M	86
3	Texas Tech	81
6	SMU	65

Semifinals; Thursday, March 9
1	Texas	74
5	Texas A&M	59
2	Arkansas	79
3	Texas Tech	72

Finals; Saturday, March 11
1	Texas	101
2	Arkansas	99
