= 1985 Southwest Conference women's basketball tournament =

- Classification: Division I
- Teams: 6
- Site: Moody Coliseum; Dallas, Texas
- Champions: Texas (3rd title)
- Winning coach: Jody Conradt (3rd title)
- MVP: Fran Harris (Texas)

1984–85 Southwest Conference women's basketball standings
	Conf.				Overall
Team	W		L	PCT	W		L	PCT
No. 1 Texas†	16	–	0	1.000	28	–	3	.903
No. 19 Texas Tech	12	–	4	.750	24	–	8	.750
Houston	11	–	5	.688	22	–	8	.733
Arkansas	11	–	5	.688	20	–	8	.714
Baylor	7	–	9	.438	12	–	14	.462
Texas A&M	7	–	9	.438	14	–	14	.500
SMU	4	–	12	.250	9	–	19	.321
Rice	2	–	14	.125	5	–	21	.192
TCU	2	–	14	.125	6	–	22	.214
† 1985 SWC tournament winner Rankings from AP Poll

The 1985 Southwest Conference women's basketball tournament was held March 4–9, 1985, at Moody Coliseum in Dallas, Texas.

Number 1 seed Texas defeated 2 seed Texas Tech 82–62 to win their third championship and receive the conference's automatic bid to the 1985 NCAA tournament.

== Format and seeding ==
The tournament consisted of a 6 team single-elimination tournament. The top two seeds had a bye to the Semifinals. The First round games occurred at campus sites.

Place	Seed	Team	Conference			Overall		
Place	Seed	Team	W	L	%	W	L	%
1	1	Texas	16	0	1.000	28	3	.903
2	2	Texas Tech	12	4	.750	24	8	.750
3	3	Houston	11	5	.688	22	8	.733
3	4	Arkansas	11	5	.688	20	8	.714
5	5	Baylor	7	9	.438	12	14	.462
5	6	Texas A&M	7	9	.438	14	14	.500
7	-	SMU	4	12	.250	9	19	.321
8	-	Rice	2	14	.125	5	21	.192
8	-	TCU	2	14	.125	6	22	.214

== Tournament ==
First round Monday, March 4
4	Arkansas	78
5	Baylor	69
3	Houston	84
6	Texas A&M	72

Semifinals; Thursday, March 7
1	Texas	104
4	Arkansas	62
2	Texas Tech	81
3	Houston	67

Finals; Saturday, March 9
1	Texas	82
2	Texas Tech	62
