= 1990 Southwest Conference women's basketball tournament =

- Classification: Division I
- Teams: 6
- Site: Moody Coliseum; Dallas, Texas
- Champions: Texas (8th title)
- Winning coach: Jody Conradt (8th title)
- MVP: Edna Campbell (Texas)

1989–90 Southwest Conference women's basketball standings
	Conf.				Overall
Team	W		L	PCT	W		L	PCT
No. 8 Texas†	15	–	1	.938	27	–	5	.844
Arkansas	15	–	1	.938	25	–	5	.833
Texas Tech	11	–	5	.688	20	–	11	.645
Houston	9	–	7	.563	17	–	12	.586
Texas A&M	8	–	8	.500	16	–	12	.571
TCU	8	–	8	.500	11	–	16	.407
Rice	3	–	13	.188	6	–	21	.222
SMU	2	–	14	.125	4	–	22	.154
Baylor	1	–	15	.063	4	–	23	.148
† 1990 SWC tournament winner Rankings from AP Poll

The 1990 Southwest Conference women's basketball tournament was held March 7–10, 1990, at Moody Coliseum in Dallas, Texas.

Number 1 seed Texas defeated 3 seed Texas Tech 63–60 to win their 8th championship and receive the conference's automatic bid to the 1990 NCAA tournament.

Texas Tech and Arkansas received at-large bids to the NCAA tournament.

== Format and seeding ==
The tournament consisted of a 6 team single-elimination tournament. The top two seeds had a bye to the Semifinals.

Place	Seed	Team	Conference			Overall		
Place	Seed	Team	W	L	%	W	L	%
1	1	Texas	15	1	.938	27	5	.844
1	2	Arkansas	15	1	.938	25	5	.833
3	3	Texas Tech	11	5	.688	20	11	.645
4	4	Houston	9	7	.563	17	12	.586
5	5	Texas A&M	8	8	.500	16	12	.571
5	6	TCU	8	8	.500	11	16	.407
7	-	Rice	3	13	.188	6	21	.222
8	-	SMU	2	14	.125	4	22	.154
9	-	Baylor	1	15	.063	4	23	.148

== Tournament ==
Quarterfinal; Wednesday, March 7
4	Houston	77
5	Texas A&M	69
3	Texas Tech	76
6	TCU	68

Semifinals; Thursday, March 8
1	Texas	101
4	Houston	58
2	Arkansas	60
3	Texas Tech	69

Finals; Saturday, March 10
1	Texas	63
3	Texas Tech	60
