= TCU Horned Frogs women's basketball =

2026–27 TCU Horned Frogs women's basketball team
- University: Texas Christian University
- Head coach: Mark Campbell (4th season)
- Location: Fort Worth, Texas
- Arena: Schollmaier Arena (capacity: 8,500)
- Conference: Big 12
- Nickname: Horned Frogs
- Colors: Purple and white

NCAA Division I tournament Elite Eight
- 2025, 2026
Other NCAA Division I tournament results
Sweet Sixteen	2025, 2026
Appearances	2001, 2002, 2003, 2004, 2005, 2006, 2007, 2009, 2010, 2025, 2026

Conference tournament champions
- 2001, 2003, 2005, 2025

Conference regular-season champions
- 2001, 2002, 2010, 2025, 2026

Uniforms
Home	Away

The TCU Horned Frogs women's basketball team represents Texas Christian University in women's basketball. The school competes in the Big 12 Conference in Division I of the National Collegiate Athletic Association (NCAA). The Horned Frogs play home basketball games at Schollmaier Arena in Fort Worth, Texas.

== History ==
The Frogs began play in 1977, and they joined Division I play in 1982. They have an all-time record of 547–607, with a 472–533 record in Division I. They have won 3 conference titles in both regular season (2001, 2002, 2010) and tournament (2001, 2003, 2005). They have reached the NCAA Tournament nine times, having a 5–9 record, going to the Second Round five times. They were a member of the Texas Association for Intercollegiate Athletics for Women (TAIAW) from 1977 to 1982, the Southwest Conference from 1982 to 1996, the Western Athletic Conference from 1996 to 2001, Conference USA from 2002 to 2005, the Mountain West Conference from 2005 to 2012, and the Big 12 Conference since 2012.

== Postseason results ==
=== NCAA tournament results ===
The Horned Frogs have appeared in the NCAA Tournament eleven times. Their combined record is 11–11.

Year	Seed	Round	Opponent	Result
2001	#11	First Round; Second Round	#6 Penn State #3 Louisiana Tech	W 77−75; L 59–80
2002	#8	First Round; Second Round	#9 Indiana #1 Duke	W 55−45; L 66–76
2003	#9	First Round; Second Round	#8 Michigan State #1 Connecticut	W 50−47; L 66–81
2004	#6	First Round; Second Round	#11 Temple #3 Georgia	W 70−57; L 71–85
2005	#7	First Round	#10 Oregon	L 55–58
2006	#11	First Round; Second Round	#6 Texas A&M #3 Rutgers	W 69−65; L 48–82
2007	#10	First Round	#7 Ole Miss	L 74–88
2009	#10	First Round	#7 South Dakota State	L 55–90
2010	#9	First Round	#8 Dayton	L 66–67
2025	#2	First Round; Second Round; Sweet Sixteen; Elite Eight	#15 Fairleigh Dickinson #7 Louisville #3 Notre Dame #1 Texas	W 73−51; W 85−70; W 71−62; L 47–58
2026	#3	First Round; Second Round; Sweet Sixteen; Elite Eight	#14 UC San Diego #6 Washington #10 Virginia #1 South Carolina	W 86−40; W 62–59 (OT); W 79–69; L 52–78

=== WNIT results ===
The Horned Frogs have appeared in the Women's National Invitation Tournament six times. Their combined record is 13–6.

Year	Round	Opponent	Result
2008	Second Round; Third Round; Quarterfinals	Boise State; Texas Tech; Colorado	W 85–56; W 81–74; L 90–96 (OT)
2014	First Round	Colorado	L 71–78
2015	First Round; Second Round	Stephen F. Austin; Southern Miss	W 85–80; L 73–77 (OT)
2016	First Round; Second Round; Third Round	Texas–Rio Grande Valley; Eastern Michigan; UTEP	W 97–73; W 85–81; L 70–79
2018	First Round; Second Round; Third Round; Quarterfinals; Semifinals	Lamar; Missouri State; New Mexico; South Dakota; Indiana	W 80–68; W 86–61; W 81–72; W 79–71; L 58–71
2019	First Round; Second Round; Third Round; Quarterfinals; Semifinals	Prairie View A&M; UT Arlington; Arkansas; Cincinnati; Arizona	W 72–41; W 71–54; W 82–78; W 69–55; L 53–59

=== WBIT results ===
The Horned Frogs have appeared in the Women's Basketball Invitation Tournament one time. Their record is 1–1.

Year	Seed	Round	Opponent	Result
2024	#3	First Round; Second Round	North Texas #2 Mississippi State	W 67–58; L 61–68

== Year by year results ==
Season	Team	Overall	Conference	Standing	Postseason	Coaches' poll	AP poll
Judy Daley (TAIAW) (1977–1979)
Texas Association for Intercollegiate Athletics for Women
1977–78	Judy Daley	5–18	–				
1978–79	Judy Daley	19–8	–				
Judy Daley:		24–26	–				
Kenneth Davis (TAIAW, Southwest) (1979–1983)
1979–80	Kenneth Davis	14–15	–				
1980–81	Kenneth Davis	20–19	–				
1981–82	Kenneth Davis	17–14	–				
Southwest Conference
1982–83	Kenneth Davis	5–23	0–8	9th			
Kenneth Davis:		56–71	0–8				
Fran Garmon (Southwest) (1983–1993)
1983–84	Fran Garmon	6–22	1–15	9th			
1984–85	Fran Garmon	6–21	2–14	T-8th			
1985–86	Fran Garmon	5–22	1–15	9th			
1986–87	Fran Garmon	10–17	3–13	9th			
1987–88	Fran Garmon	12–15	5–11	T-7th			
1988–89	Fran Garmon	9–16	4–12	8th			
1989–90	Fran Garmon	11–16	8–8	T-5th			
1990–91	Fran Garmon	5–22	2–14	9th			
1991–92	Fran Garmon	4–24	0–16	8th			
1992–93	Fran Garmon	10–17	1–13	8th			
Fran Garmon:		78–192	27–131				
Shell Robinson (Southwest) (1993–1996)
1993–94	Shell Robinson	5–20	1–13	8th			
1994–95	Shell Robinson	1–27	0–14	8th			
1995–96	Shell Robinson	2–25	0–14	8th			
Shell Robinson:		8–72	1–41				
Mike Petersen (WAC) (1996–1999)
Western Athletic Conference
1996–97	Mike Petersen	13–14	7–9	T-9th (T-5th, Mountain Division)			
1997–98	Mike Petersen	13–15	4–10	T-12th (T-6th, Pacific Division)			
1998–99	Mike Petersen	16–12	7–7	T-8th (T-4th, Mountain Division)			
Mike Petersen:		42–41	18–26				
Jeff Mittie (WAC, C-USA, Mountain West, Big 12) (1999–2014)
1999–2000	Jeff Mittie	16–14	7–7	5th			
2000–01	Jeff Mittie	25–8	13–3	1st	NCAA Second Round		
Conference USA
2001–02	Jeff Mittie	25–7	12–2	1st	NCAA Second Round		25
2002–03	Jeff Mittie	22–14	8–6	T-5th	NCAA Second Round		
2003–04	Jeff Mittie	27–7	11–3	2nd	NCAA Second Round	20	
2004–05	Jeff Mittie	25–10	10–4	T-3rd	NCAA First Round	23	
Mountain West Conference
2005–06	Jeff Mittie	21–12	11–5	T-3rd	NCAA Second Round		
2006–07	Jeff Mittie	22–11	11–5	T-2nd	NCAA First Round		
2007–08	Jeff Mittie	24–12	13–3	2nd	WNIT Quarterfinal		
2008–09	Jeff Mittie	20–11	12–4	3rd	NCAA First Round		
2009–10	Jeff Mittie	23–9	12–4	1st	NCAA First Round		
2010–11	Jeff Mittie	22–11	13–3	2nd	WNIT First Round		
2011–12	Jeff Mittie	17–14	9–5	T-3rd			
Big 12 Conference
2012–13	Jeff Mittie	10–21	2–16	10th			
2013–14	Jeff Mittie	19–15	8–10	7th	WNIT First Round		
Jeff Mittie:		318–176	152–80				
Raegan Pebley (Big 12) (2014–2023)
2014–15	Raegan Pebley	18–14	9–9	T-3rd	WNIT Second Round		
2015–16	Raegan Pebley	18–15	8–10	T-6th	WNIT Third Round		
2016–17	Raegan Pebley	12–18	4–14	9th			
2017–18	Raegan Pebley	23–13	9–9	5th	WNIT Semifinals		
2018–19	Raegan Pebley	24–11	10–8	5th	WNIT Semifinals		
2019–20	Raegan Pebley	22–7	13–5	2nd	Cancelled due to COVID-19 pandemic		
2020–21	Raegan Pebley	10–15	4–14	8th			
2021–22	Raegan Pebley	6–22	2–16	10th			
2022–23	Raegan Pebley	8–23	1–17	10th			
Raegan Pebley:		141–138	60–102				
Mark Campbell (Big 12) (2023–present)
2023–24	Mark Campbell	21–12	6–12	9th	WBIT Second Round		
2024–25	Mark Campbell	34–4	16–2	1st	NCAA Elite Eight	6	6
2025–26	Mark Campbell	32–6	15–3	1st	NCAA Elite Eight	6	6
Mark Campbell:		87–22	37–17				
Total:		741–735					
National champion Postseason invitational champion Conference regular season champion Conference regular season and conference tournament champion Division regular season champion Division regular season and conference tournament champion Conference tournament champion
