= Rice Owls women's basketball =

2025–26 Rice Owls women's basketball team
- University: Rice University
- Head coach: Lindsay Edmonds (4th season)
- Location: Houston, Texas
- Arena: Tudor Fieldhouse (capacity: 5,000)
- Conference: The American
- Nickname: Owls
- Colors: Blue and gray
- All-time record: 698–625 (.528)

NCAA Division I tournament second round
- 2000

NCAA Division I tournament appearances
- 2000, 2005, 2019, 2024

Conference tournament champions
- 2000, 2005, 2019, 2024

Conference regular-season champions
- 2005, 2019, 2020, 2021, 2026

Conference division champions
- 2021

Uniforms
Home	Away

The Rice Owls women's basketball team represents Rice University in women's basketball. The school competes in the American Conference in Division I of the National Collegiate Athletic Association (NCAA). The Owls play home basketball games at Tudor Fieldhouse in Houston, Texas.

== History ==
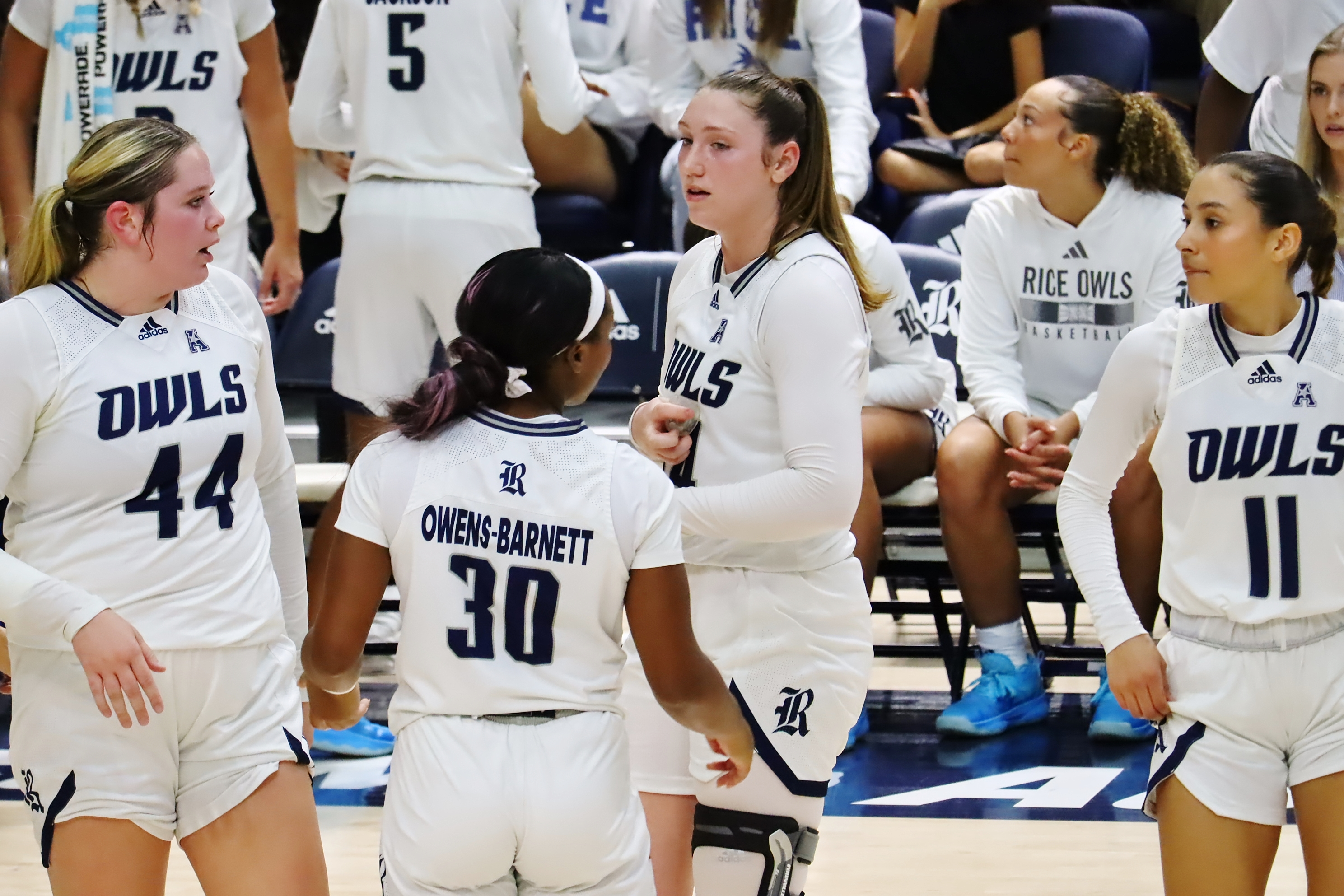
Members of the Rice Owls women's basketball team during a game at Tudor Fieldhouse in 2023

The Owls played in the Southwest Conference from 1982 to 1995 and the Western Athletic Conference from 1996 to 2004 before joining Conference USA in 2005. As of the end of the 2020–21 season, they had a 659–601 all-time record. They were champions of the Women's Basketball Invitational in 2017, and of the Women's National Invitation Tournament in 2021.

Season	Coach	Record	Conference record
1978–79	Linda Tucker	12–16	n/a
1979–80	Linda Tucker	15–14	n/a
1980–81	Linda Tucker	16–12	n/a
1981–82	Linda Tucker	21–8	n/a
1982–83	Linda Tucker	8–18	1–6
1983–84	Linda Tucker	9–16	3–13
1984–85	Linda Tucker	5–21	2–14
1985–86	Linda Tucker	6–19	2–14
1986–87	Linda Tucker	15–13	6–9
1987–88	Linda Tucker	11–14	5–11
1988–89	Linda Tucker	14–13	5–11
1989–90	Mike Dunavant	6–21	3–13
1990–91	Mike Dunavant	10–18	4–12
1991–92	Mike Dunavant	13–15	5–9
1992–93	Mike Dunavant	13–14	3–11
1993–94	Cristy McKinney	13–14	5–9
1994–95	Cristy McKinney	11–16	6–6
1995–96	Cristy McKinney	13–14	6–8
1996–97	Cristy McKinney	16–11	11–5
1997–98	Cristy McKinney	21–9	11–3
1998–99	Cristy McKinney	20–12	9–5
1999-00	Cristy McKinney	22–10	10–4
2000–01	Cristy McKinney	18–12	9–6
2001–02	Cristy McKinney	21–9	14–4
2002–03	Cristy McKinney	15–12	12–6
2003–04	Cristy McKinney	22–10	16–2
2004–05	Cristy McKinney	24–9	14–4
2005–06	Greg Williams	18–14	11–5
2006–07	Greg Williams	19–14	10–6
2007–08	Greg Williams	14–18	6–10
2008–09	Greg Williams	6–23	2–14
2009–10	Greg Williams	13–16	6–9
2010–11	Greg Williams	18–14	10–6
2011–12	Greg Williams	16–16	9–6
2012–13	Greg Williams	14 16	6–10
2013–14	Greg Williams	13–16	6–10
2014–15	Greg Williams	9–21	4–14
2015–16	Tina Langley	9–22	6–11
2016–17	Tina Langley	22–13	8–10
2017–18	Tina Langley	23–10	10–6
2018–19	Tina Langley	28–4	16–0
2019–20	Tina Langley	21–8	16–2
2020–21	Tina Langley	22–4	12–2
2021–22	Lindsay Edmonds	14–13	8–9
2022–23	Lindsay Edmonds	23–9	13–7
2023–24	Lindsay Edmonds	19–15	9–9

== NCAA tournament results ==
Year	Seed	Round	Opponent	Result
2000	#13	First round Second round	#4 UC Santa Barbara #5 UNC	W 67–64; L 50–83
2005	#11	First round	#6 Georgia	L 49–75
2019	#12	First round	#5 Marquette	L 54–58 (OT)
2024	#14	First round	#3 LSU	L 60–70
