= Sheryl Swoopes =

American basketball player (born 1971)

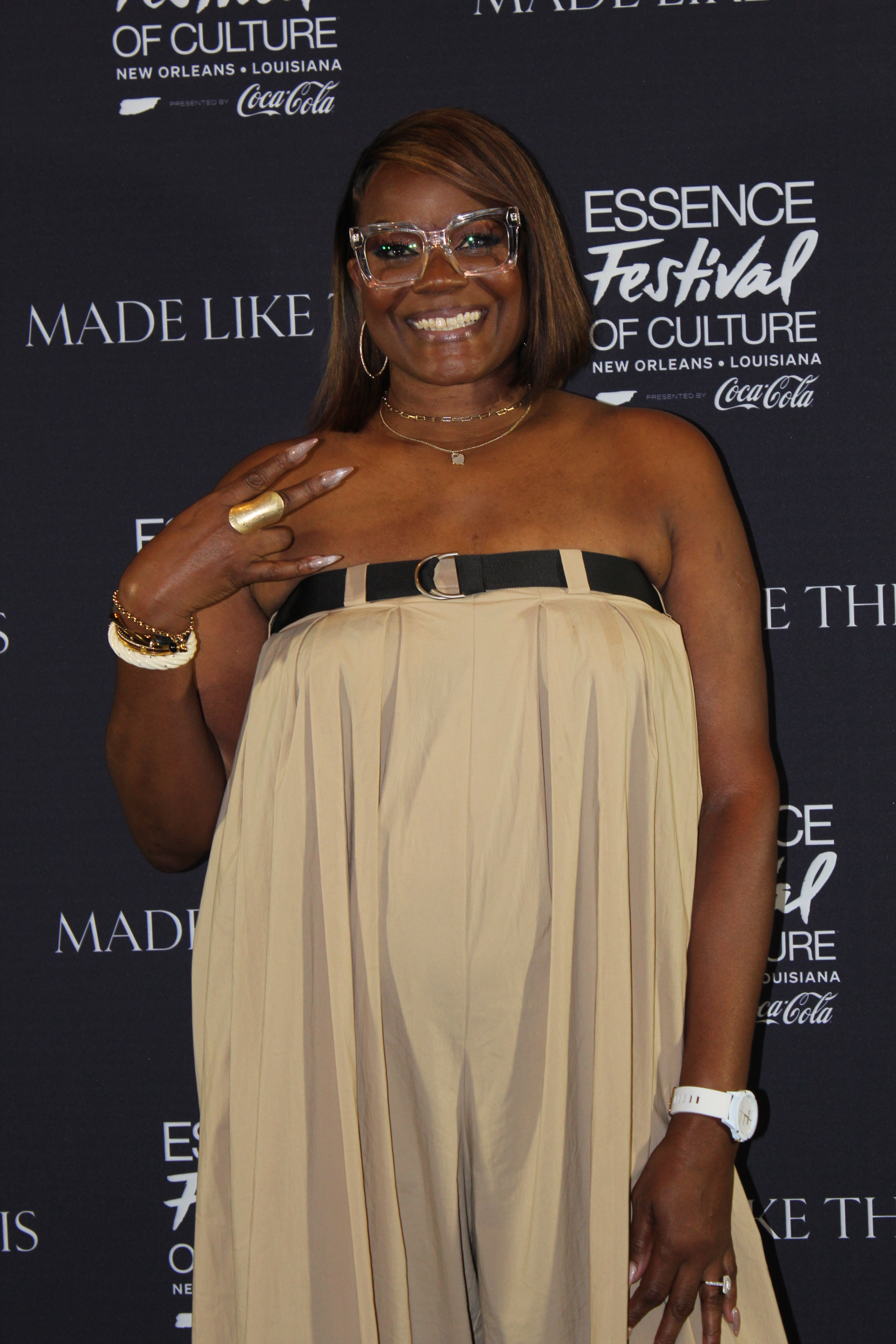
- Swoopes at Essence Festival of Culture in 2025

Personal information
- Born: March 25, 1971 (age 55) Brownfield, Texas, U.S.
- Listed height: 6 ft 0 in (1.83 m)
- Listed weight: 145 lb (66 kg)

Career information
- High school: Brownfield (Brownfield, Texas)
- College: South Plains (1989–1991); Texas Tech (1991–1993)
- WNBA draft: 1997: Allocated
- Drafted by: Houston Comets
- Playing career: 1997–2011
- Position: Shooting guard / small forward
- Number: 22
- Coaching career: 2009–present

Career history

Playing
- 1997–2007: Houston Comets
- 2008: Seattle Storm
- 2011: Tulsa Shock

Coaching
- 2009–2010: Mercer Island HS (assistant)
- 2013–2016: Loyola Chicago
- 2017–2018: Texas Tech (assistant)

Career highlights
- 4× WNBA champion (1997–2000); 3× WNBA MVP (2000, 2002, 2005); 6× WNBA All-Star (1999, 2000, 2002, 2003, 2005, 2006); WNBA All-Star Game MVP (2005); 5× All-WNBA First Team (1998–2000, 2002, 2005); 2× All-WNBA Second Team (2003, 2006); 3× WNBA Defensive Player of the Year (2000, 2002, 2003); 2× WNBA All-Defensive First Team (2005, 2006); 2× WNBA scoring champion (2000, 2005); 2× WNBA steals leader (2000, 2003); WNBA Peak Performer (2005); WNBA anniversary teams (10th, 15th, 20th, 25th); NCAA champion (1993); NCAA Tournament MOP (1993); Honda Sports Award (1993); Naismith College Player of the Year (1993); USBWA National Player of the Year (1993); WBCA Player of the Year (1993); 2× All-American – USBWA (1992, 1993); 2× Kodak All-American (1992, 1993)

Career WNBA statistics
- Points: 4,875 (15.0 ppg)
- Rebounds: 1,596 (4.9 rpg)
- Assists: 1,037 (3.2 apg)
- Stats at WNBA.com
- Stats at Basketball Reference
- Basketball Hall of Fame
- Women's Basketball Hall of Fame
Medals
Women's basketball
Representing the United States
Olympic Games
Gold medal – first place	1996 Atlanta	Team competition
Gold medal – first place	2000 Sydney	Team competition
Gold medal – first place	2004 Athens	Team competition
World Cup
Gold medal – first place	1998 Germany	Team competition
Gold medal – first place	2002 China	Team competition
Bronze medal – third place	1994 Australia	Team competition
Bronze medal – third place	2006 Brazil	Team competition
Goodwill Games
Gold medal – first place	1994 St. Petersburg	Team competition

Sheryl Denise Swoopes (born March 25, 1971) is an American former professional basketball player. She was the first player to be signed in the WNBA, is a three-time WNBA MVP, and was named one of the league's Top 15 Players of All Time at the 2011 WNBA All-Star Game. Swoopes has won three Olympic gold medals and is one of eleven women's basketball players to have won an Olympic gold medal, an NCAA Championship, a FIBA World Cup gold, and a WNBA title. She has been inducted into the Naismith Memorial Basketball Hall of Fame twice: in 2016 for her individual career, and in 2026 as a member of the 1996 United States women's Olympic basketball team. In 2017, she was inducted into the Women's Basketball Hall of Fame.

== Early life ==
Born in Brownfield, Texas, Swoopes was raised by her mother, Louise Swoopes, and played basketball with her three older brothers. She began competing at age seven in a local children's league called Little Dribblers. She played basketball at Brownfield High School.

== College career ==
Initially recruited by the University of Texas, Swoopes left the school shortly after her arrival, without playing a game, and enrolled at South Plains College. After playing at South Plains for two years, Swoopes transferred to Texas Tech.

In 1993, Swoopes won the NCAA women's basketball championship with the Texas Tech Lady Raiders during her senior season. Her jersey was retired by the school the following year, making her one of only three Lady Raiders to be honored in this way. The others are Carolyn Thompson and Krista Kirkland, Swoopes' teammate from the 1993 championship team.

As of 2010, Swoopes was still a part of the women's basketball record books in many categories, including single-game scoring record (53 points on March 13, 1993, vs. Texas, tied for tenth place), single-season scoring (955 points in the 1993 season, fourth place), highest championship tournament scoring average (35.4 in the 1993 tournament, second place), best single-game championship scoring performance (47 points vs. Ohio State, 1993 championship), which broke Bill Walton's record, and scoring record for championship series (177 points, five games). She set the record for the most field goals in the championship game with 16.

Swoopes also set several school records at Texas Tech. She scored 955 in the 1992–93 season, which is an all-time scoring record for a single season (as of 2006). Swoopes' 24.9 points-per-game average for her career is the best in school history; she also boasts three triple-doubles and 23 double-doubles, 14 of which came during her senior year.

Swoopes was the 1993 winner of the Naismith College Player of the Year award at the age of 22, the Honda Sports Award, was selected as that year's WBCA Player of the Year, and was chosen to the Division I All-American squad in both 1992 and 1993. Swoopes was named the 1993 Sportswoman of the Year (in the team category) by the Women's Sports Foundation.

=== Texas Tech statistics ===
Legend
GP	Games played	GS	Games started	MPG	Minutes per game
FG%	Field goal percentage	3P%	3-point field goal percentage	FT%	Free throw percentage
RPG	Rebounds per game	APG	Assists per game	SPG	Steals per game
BPG	Blocks per game	PPG	Points per game	**Bold**	Career high

Year	Team	GP	Points	FG%	3P%	FT%	RPG	APG	SPG	BPG	PPG
1992	Texas Tech	32	690	50.3%	41.0%	80.8%	8.9	**4.8**	**3.4**	1.0	21.6
1993	Texas Tech	**34**	**955**	**54.6%**	**41.0%**	**86.8%**	**9.2**	4.1	3.4	**1.0**	**28.1**
Career		66	1645	52.7%	41.0%	84.4%	9.0	4.4	3.4	1.0	24.9

== USA Basketball ==
Swoopes was named to the USA national team and competed in the 1994 World Championships, held in June 1994 in Sydney, Australia. The team was coached by Tara VanDerveer, and won their first six games, when they faced Brazil. In a closely contested, high-scoring game, Brazil hit 10 of 10 free throws in the final minute to secure a 110–107 victory. The USA won a close final game against Australia 100–95 to earn the bronze medal. Swoopes averaged 9.1 points per game, while recording seven steals, second highest on the team.

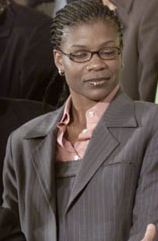
Sheryl Swoopes, 2001

Swoopes was selected to represent the US at the 1995 USA Women's Pan American Games, but only four teams committed to participate, so the event was cancelled.

Swoopes continued as a member of the USA team at the 1996 Olympics, held in Atlanta, Georgia. The USA team won all their pool play games by large margins, although they were behind Cuba by as many as seven points before Lisa Leslie's 24 points helped the USA take over the game.

In 2002, Swoopes was named to the national team which competed in the World Championships in Zhangjiagang, Changzhou, and Nanjing, China. The team was coached by Van Chancellor. Swoopes scored 16.9 points per game, second highest on the team and recorded a team-high 24 steals. The USA team won all nine games, including a close title game against Russia, which had a one-point difference late in the game.

Swoopes was named to the National Team representing the US at the 2006 World Championships, held in Barueri and Sao Paulo, Brazil. The team won eight of their nine contests, but the lone loss came in the semifinal medal round to Russia. The USA beat Brazil in the final game to earn the bronze medal. Swoopes, hampered by injuries, averaged 3.0 points per game and was second on the team with six blocks.

== WNBA career ==
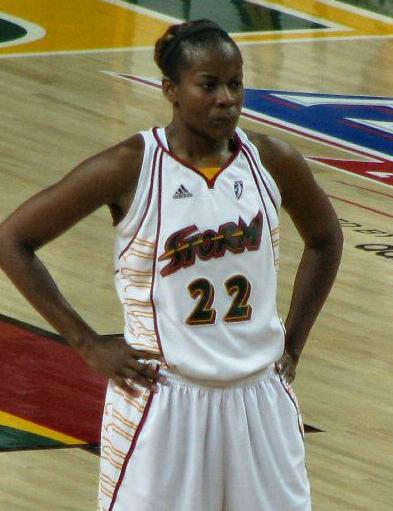
Swoopes for the Seattle Storm in 2008

Swoopes was recruited for the Houston Comets of the WNBA during the 1997 inaugural season. Due to the birth of her son, Swoopes had a late-season debut for her career, playing her first game on August 7, 1997 (6 weeks after the season started). In her debut game, the Comets defeated the Phoenix Mercury 74 - 70 with Swoopes playing for 5 minutes and recording no stats.

As a 11 year member of the Houston Comets, she accumulated over 2,000 career points, 500 career rebounds, 300 career assists, and 200 career steals. Her extraordinary scoring and defensive ability made her the first three-time WNBA MVP (2000, 2002, and 2005) and the first three-time WNBA Defensive Player of the Year (2000, 2002, and 2003). Swoopes is also a four-time WNBA champion as the Comets won the first 4 championships in WNBA history from 1997 to 2000.

Swoopes is the second player in WNBA history to win both the regular season MVP award and the All-Star Game MVP award in the same season. The first player to accomplish this was Lisa Leslie. Swoopes is also the first player in WNBA history to record a triple-double in both the regular season and the playoffs.

Swoopes gained national prominence when she won the gold medal with the USA Basketball Women's National Team at the 1996 Olympic Games and became a focal point of the fledgling WNBA. The 1996 Olympic win over Brazil (117–87) is considered by some to be the "best woman's basketball game they'd ever seen." She is a three-time Olympic gold medalist (1996, 2000, and 2004).

Swoopes is the first women's basketball player to have a Nike shoe named after her: the "Air Swoopes".

On March 3, 2008, Swoopes signed with the Seattle Storm, ending her 11-year career with the Houston Comets. She was waived by the Storm on February 3, 2009.

Two days after her 40th birthday in 2011, sources for the Associated Press claimed that Swoopes was preparing to return to the WNBA in anticipation of an official signing announcement from the Tulsa Shock. At the 2011 WNBA All-Star Game, she was announced as one of the top 15 players in the 15-year history of the WNBA.

On August 26, 2011, the 40-year-old Swoopes hit a buzzer-beating shot to edge the Los Angeles Sparks 77–75 and end the Shock's WNBA-record 20-game losing streak.

Swoopes' final WNBA game was played on September 11, 2011, a 94–102 loss to the San Antonio Silver Stars, where she recorded 20 points, 7 rebounds and 4 assists. After the 2011 season, on February 12, 2012, Tulsa Shock owner Steve Swetoha announced that the team did not intend to offer Swoopes a new contract and she became an unrestricted free agent.

In 2016, she was voted into the WNBA Top 20@20, in celebration of the league's 20th anniversary, and in 2021 to The W25, a celebration of the league's 25th anniversary.

== International career ==
=== Europe ===
- 1993–1994: (Italy) Basket Bari
- 2004–2005: (Russia) VBM-SGAU Samara
- 2005–2006: (Italy) Taranto Cras Basket
- 2010: (Greece) Esperides Kallitheas

== Awards and honors ==
Swoopes won the female Associated Press Athlete of the Year award in 1993. The same year, she also won the Honda Sports Award for basketball and the WBCA Player of the Year award. She was named one of the top 20 female athletes of the decade for 2000 to 2010 by Sports Illustrated. In 2026, Swoopes was ranked on the Forbes "Self-Made 250: The Greatest Living Self-Made Americans" list.

== Post-playing career ==
In 2008, Sheryl Swoopes made an appearance on Shirts & Skins, a reality series on Logo TV. Swoopes mentored the San Francisco Rockdogs, a gay basketball team, and shared her experiences on basketball, family, faith, and coming out.

In 2010, Swoopes was an assistant basketball coach at Mercer Island High School in Washington. She was a color analyst for the Texas Tech women's basketball broadcast during the 2012–2013 season.

In 2013, Swoopes became head coach of the Loyola University Chicago women's basketball team. In April 2016, Loyola announced that it was investigating Swoopes for alleged mistreatment, after the school newspaper reported that 10 of the team's players had either transferred or wanted a release from their scholarships. On July 4, 2016, Loyola announced it had fired Swoopes as a result of the investigation but declined to say what it had found.

In July 2017, Swoopes returned to her alma mater, Texas Tech, as the women's basketball Director of Player Development, where her job included resuming work as color analysis for broadcast Lady Raiders games. Following the firing of head coach Candi Whitaker on January 1, 2018, Swoopes was promoted to regular assistant coach under interim head coach Shimmy Gray-Miller. In October 2024, Swoopes and Jordan Robinson, journalist and podcaster, began a weekly podcast titled Queens of the Court.

== Personal life ==
Swoopes was married from June 1995 to 1999 to her high-school sweetheart, Eric Jackson. The two have a son, Jordan Eric Jackson (b. 1997), named after Michael Jordan. Jordan Jackson, who was born some two months before his mother's WNBA debut, is also a basketball player and in 2024, wearing his Maine Celtics uniform with the same number 22 Sheryl wore during her career, won the G League's dunk contest.

In October 2005, Swoopes announced she was gay, becoming one of the highest-profile athletes in a team sport to do so publicly. Swoopes stated

It doesn't change who I am. I can't help who I fall in love with. No one can. Discovering I'm gay just sort of happened much later in life. Being intimate with [Alisa] or any other woman never entered my mind. At the same time, I'm a firm believer that when you fall in love with somebody, you can't control that."

In 2016, she was named an LGBT History Month Icon by the Equality Forum. She and her partner, former basketball player and Houston Comets assistant coach Alisa Scott, together raised Swoopes' son.

The couple separated in 2011. Later that year, Swoopes got engaged to Chris Unclesho, a longtime male friend. After a long engagement, the couple wed on July 21, 2017.

Swoopes is an honorary member of Sigma Gamma Rho sorority; she was inducted on July 5, 2025.

== WNBA career statistics ==
Legend
GP	Games played	GS	Games started	MPG	Minutes per game	RPG	Rebounds per game
APG	Assists per game	SPG	Steals per game	BPG	Blocks per game	PPG	Points per game
TO	Turnovers per game	FG%	Field-goal percentage	3P%	3-point field-goal percentage	FT%	Free-throw percentage
**Bold**	Career best	°	League leader

†	Denotes seasons in which Swoopes won a WNBA championship

=== Regular season ===
Year	Team	GP	GS	MPG	FG%	3P%	FT%	RPG	APG	SPG	BPG	TO	PPG
1997^{†}	Houston	9	0	14.3	.472	.250	.714	1.7	0.8	0.8	0.4	**0.44**	7.1
1998^{†}	Houston	29	29	32.3	.427	.360	.826	5.1	2.1	2.5	0.5	2.00	15.6
1999^{†}	Houston	32	32	34.4	.462	.337	.820	**6.3**	4.0	2.4	**1.4**	2.59	18.3
2000^{†}	Houston	31	31	35.2	**.506**	**.374**	.821	**6.3**	3.8	**2.8**°	1.1	2.65	**20.7**°
2002	Houston	32	32	36.1	.434	.288	.825	4.9	3.3	**2.8**	0.7	2.72	18.5
2003	Houston	31	30	35.0	.406	.304	**.887**	4.6	3.9	2.5°	0.8	2.35	15.6
2004	Houston	31	31	34.5	.422	.308	.856	4.9	2.9	1.5	0.5	1.90	14.8
2005	Houston	**33**	**33**	**37.1**°	.447	.360	.850	3.6	**4.3**	2.0	0.8	2.18	18.6°
2006	Houston	31	31	35.8°	.413	.278	.764	5.9	3.7	2.1	0.3	2.39	15.5
2007	Houston	3	3	35.3	.360	.143	1.000	5.7	3.7	1.7	0.3	3.00	7.7
2008	Seattle	29	25	24.3	.391	.222	.695	4.3	2.1	1.5	0.3	1.07	7.1
2011	Tulsa	33	28	29.9	.398	.319	.870	4.1	2.3	0.8	0.3	1.36	8.2
Career	12 years, 3 teams	324	205	32.7	.436	.316	.825	4.9	3.2	2.0	0.7	2.09	15.0

=== Postseason ===
Year	Team	GP	GS	MPG	FG%	3P%	FT%	RPG	APG	SPG	BPG	TO	PPG
1997^{†}	Houston	2	0	7.0	.000	.000	.000	1.5	0.0	0.0	0.5	**0.00**	0.0
1998^{†}	Houston	5	5	37.6	.443	.278	.933	**10.0**	5.2	1.8	**1.4**	3.20	14.6
1999^{†}	Houston	**6**	**6**	36.0	.358	.308	.929	3.7	1.2	2.3	0.5	2.00	14.7
2000^{†}	Houston	**6**	**6**	36.7	**.471**	**.471**	.793	5.7	3.2	2.8	0.0	2.00	18.8
2002	Houston	3	3	**42.3**°	.397	.333	.800	7.3	**5.7**	**4.0**	0.7	2.67	**24.3**
2003	Houston	3	3	36.7	.435	.100	**.938**	6.3	4.3	1.3	0.7	1.67	18.7
2005	Houston	5	5	37.8	.402	.357	.810	5.6	3.8	1.4	0.4	3.00	18.4
2006	Houston	2	2	31.0	.389	.167	.875	2.5	1.5	1.0	1.0	1.00	11.0
2008	Seattle	3	2	24.0	.320	.200	.889	3.3	1.0	2.0	0.0	1.67	8.7
Career	9 years, 2 teams	35	32	34.3	.406	.293	.861	5.5	3.1	2.0	0.5	2.14	15.5

== Head coaching record ==
Record table
Season	Team	Overall	Conference	Standing	Postseason
Loyola Ramblers (Missouri Valley Conference) (2013–2016)
2013–14	Loyola (Chicago)	11–21	6–12	8th	
2014–15	Loyola (Chicago)	6–25	3–15	9th	
2015–16	Loyola (Chicago)	14–16	10–8	5th	
Loyola (Chicago):		31–62	19–35		
Total:		31–62			

== See also ==
- List of WNBA players
