= William Curry Holden =

American historian and archeologist

- Born: July 19, 1896; Coolidge, Limestone County, Texas, USA
- Died: April 21, 1993 (aged 96); Lubbock, Texas
- Occupations: Historian, Archeologist, Educator
- Spouse(s): (1) Olive Holden née Price (1926–1937, her death) (2) Frances "Fran" Virginia Holden née Mayhugh (1939–1993, his death)
- Children: Jane Kelley Holden (from first marriage)
- Parent(s): Robert Lee Holden and Grace E. Holden née Davis

William Curry Holden (July 19, 1896 – April 21, 1993) was an American historian and archaeologist. In 1937, he became the first director of the Museum of Texas Tech University in Lubbock, Texas.

== Early years, education, military ==
Holden was one of three sons born to Robert Lee Holden and Grace Holden née Davis in Coolidge, Texas. Both families moved west to Colorado City, Texas, and after 1907 the Holdens farmed near Rotan, Texas, where William completed high school in 1914.

In summer 1914 he obtained teacher certification at the now-closed Stamford Junior College in Stamford, Texas. At first refused jobs because he was "too spindly", in 1915 he became the only teacher for 47 students in nine classes at the one-room schoolhouse in Pleasant Valley. He organized a literary club and basketball teams and led the students to victory in the county interscholastic meeting.

Holden studied Texas history under Professor Joseph A. Hill at West Texas Normal College (now West Texas A&M University) in Canyon, Texas, during the summers of 1917 and 1918. During World War I, Holden served in the Eighty-sixth United States Army Infantry at San Antonio.

== University of Texas and McMurry College ==
After his military service, Holden obtained a job as principal at his alma mater, Rotan High School. However, he left the position soon thereafter and entered the University of Texas, where he eventually earned his bachelor's (1923), master's (1924), and PhD (1928) degrees. He also spent a summer each at the University of Chicago and the University of Colorado. In 1923, Holden became founding chairman of the history department at the newly established McMurry College (now McMurry University).

== Forty years at Texas Tech University ==
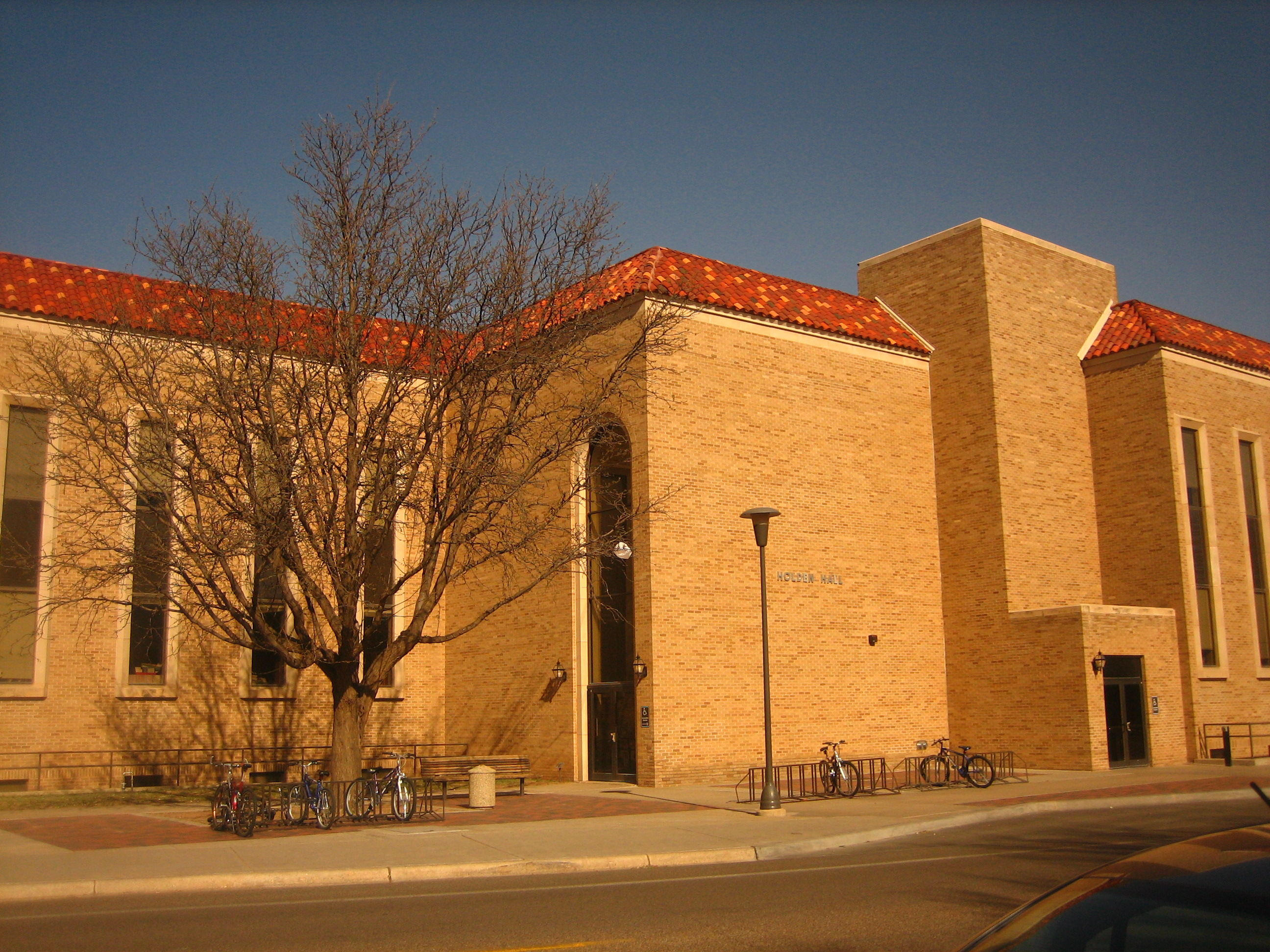
Holden Hall at Texas Tech University

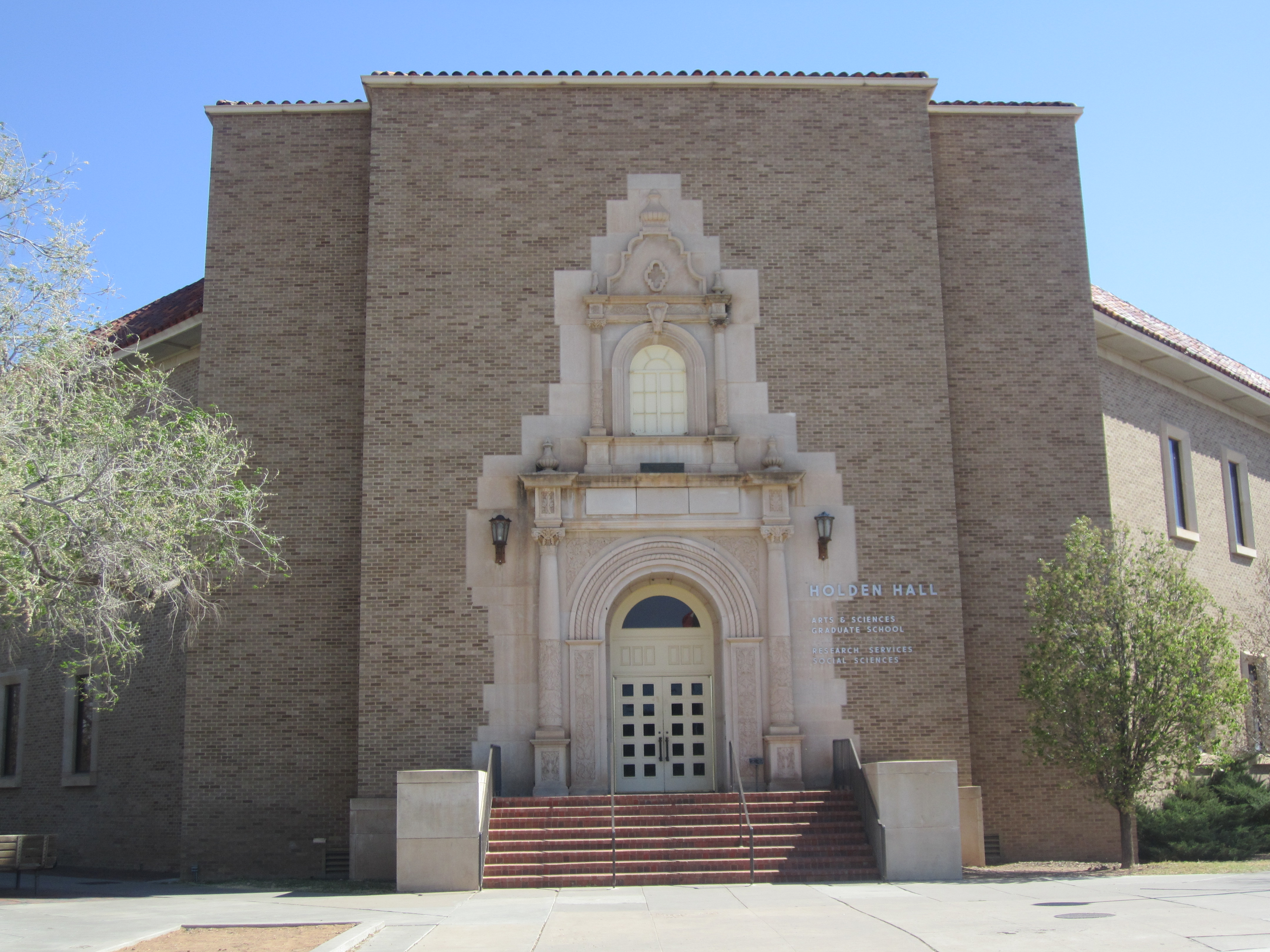
Main entrance to Holden Hall

In 1929, Holden joined the faculty of Texas Technological College (now Texas Tech University) to teach history and anthropology. He remained there for more than four decades, becoming chairman of the history department in 1936, dean and director of anthropological, historical, and social-science research in 1938, and in 1945, dean of the Graduate School, a position that he retained until 1950. He received the Distinguished Faculty Emeritus Award of the College of Arts and Sciences and, in 1965, was named Distinguished Director Emeritus of the Museum at Texas Tech University. Holden Hall, the original location of the museum and now used for classrooms and offices, was named in his honor in 1972.

=== Building the Museum of Texas Tech University ===
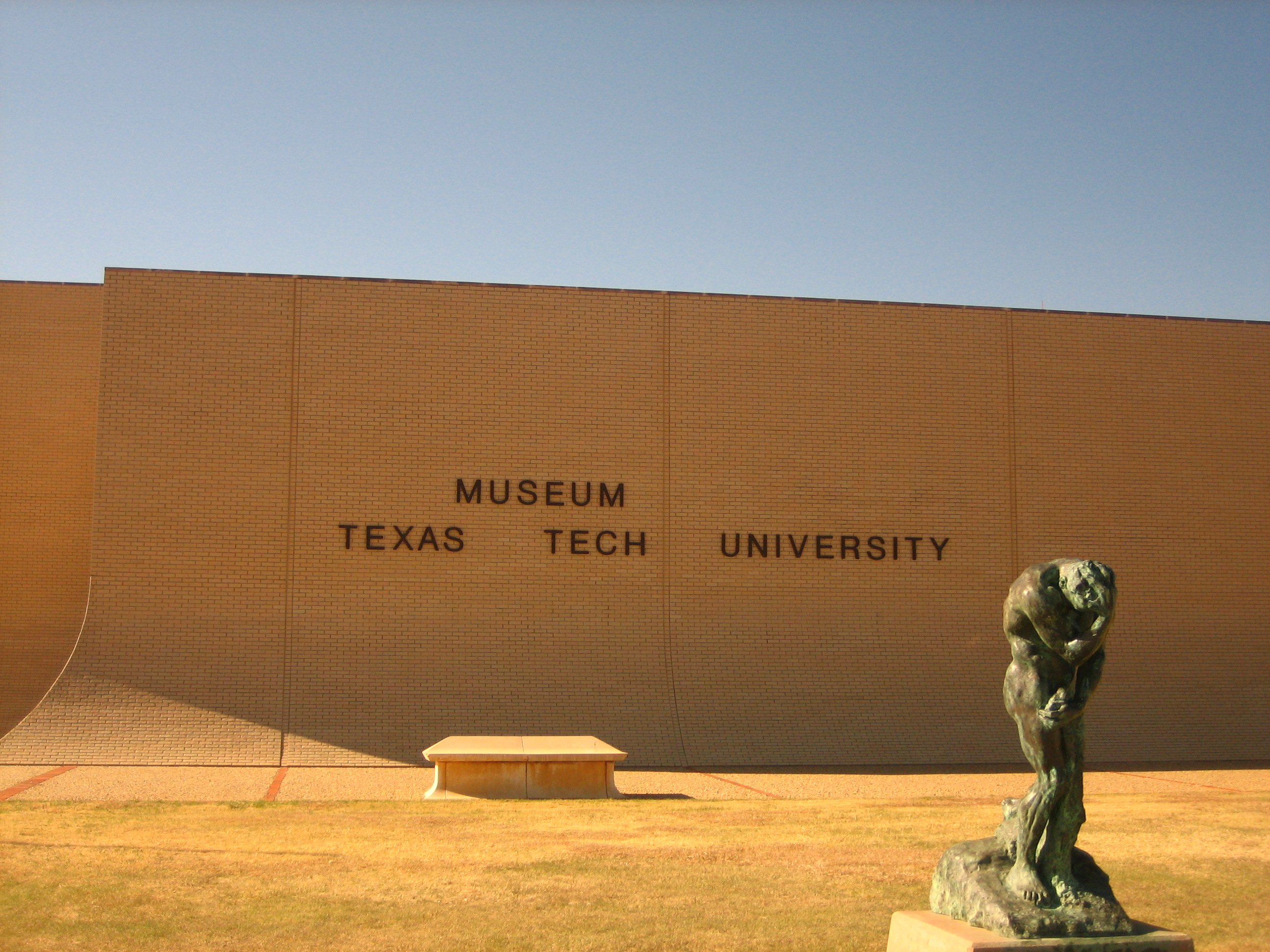
Holden laid the groundwork for the Museum of Texas Tech University

In 1935, Holden organized the West Texas Museum Association and sought funds from the Texas Centennial Commission for the West Texas Museum (now known as the Museum of Texas Tech University).

In 1955, Holden, J. Evetts Haley, and other historians organized the Southwest Collection and Archives, which contained West Texas ranch records.

== Archeological excavations ==
Excavations undertaken in 1930 and 1931 in the Panhandle uncovered Saddleback and Antelope Creek Phase ruins on the Canadian River. In 1932, Holden directed a field school at the Tecolote ruin near Las Vegas, New Mexico. In 1933, 1935, and 1937, he and his students excavated and restored the Early Glaze-period Arrowhead Ruin east of Santa Fe, New Mexico, including a rare D-shaped kiva.

Holden's most significant archeological discovery occurred in 1937, when two of his students found a Paleo-Indian flint point in Yellow House Draw. Holden played a major role in the long struggle to preserve the site, which was finally in 1989 designated the Lubbock Lake National Historic and State Archeological Landmark.

Holden led archeological field trips to Mexico in 1934, 1936, 1938, and 1940. In 1934 he took students on an expedition to Sonora to study the Yaqui, and the university sponsored a second expedition the following year, leading to the book Studies of the Yaqui Indians of Sonora, Mexico (1936), for which Holden was primary author, writing five articles.

== Marriages and later years ==
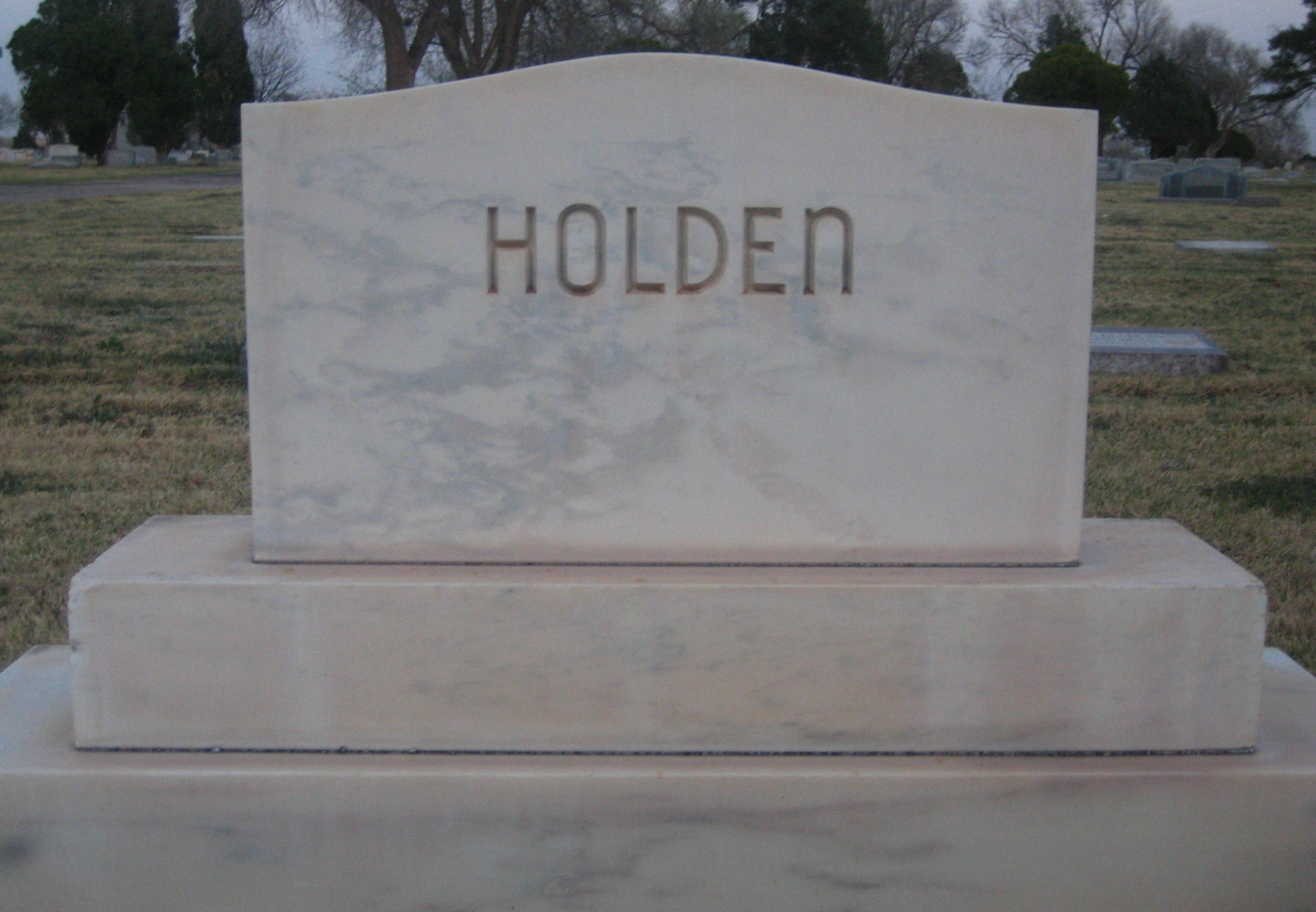
Holden family marker at the City of Lubbock Cemetery

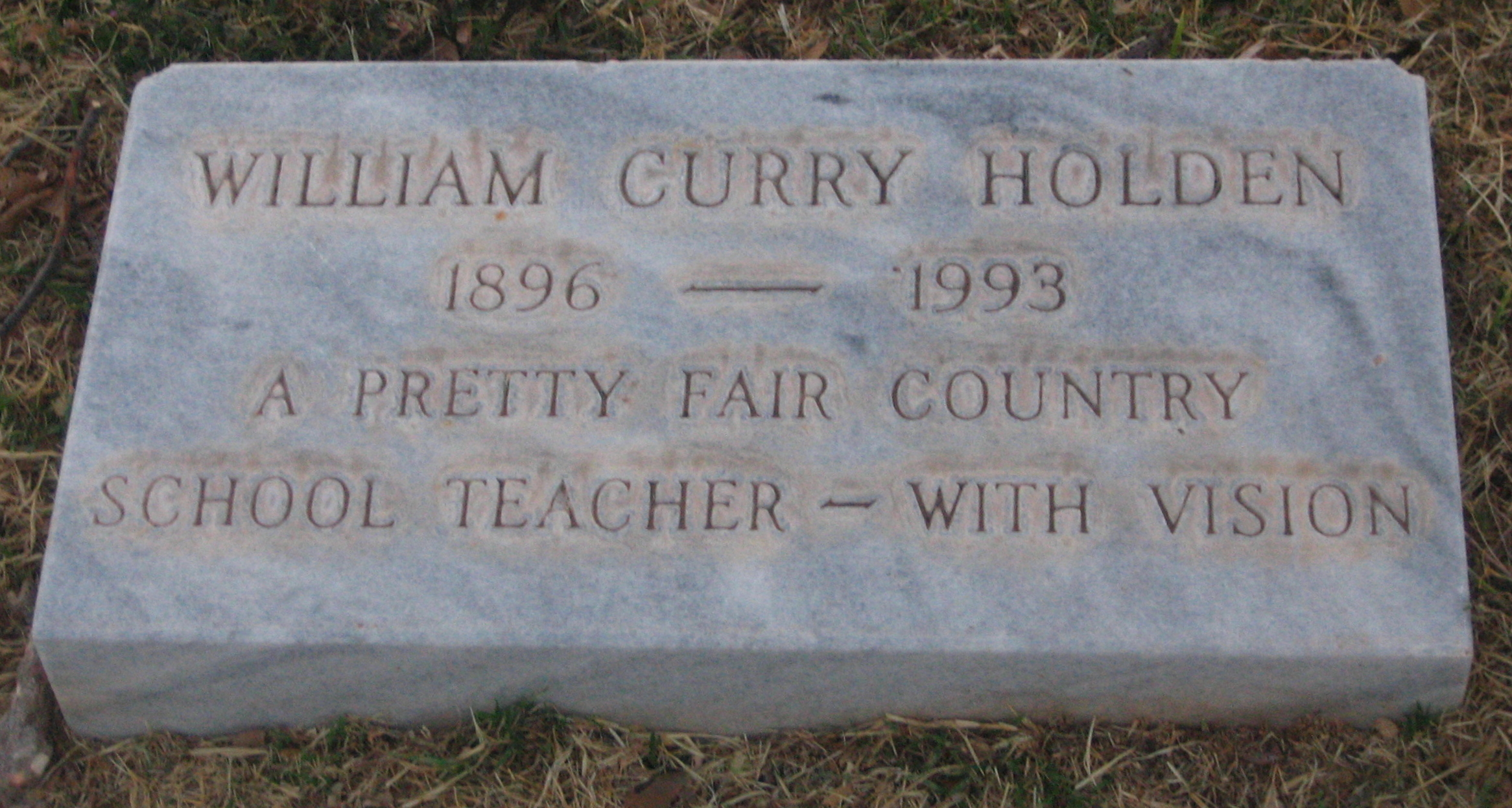
Holden's marker refers to him as "A Pretty Fair Country School Teacher – With Vision"

Holden was twice married. His first wife, Olive Price Holden (1903–1937), died eleven years after their marriage. She studied anthropology at the University of Texas at Austin, where she became a student of southwestern cultures and adobe construction. While at Texas Tech, she worked at the library as an instructor and a reference librarian and helped to organize the early program for the Tech Anthropology Department. She established the Koshari social club for women, which became Phi Beta Phi. She was instrumental in designing and spurring the construction of the adobe residential complex south of campus. A Texas Tech memorial fund, the Olive Price Holden Memorial Endowment, underwrites the purchase of books for the Southwest Collect and Special Collections Library.

On March 26, 1939, Holden married Frances Virginia "Fran" Holden née Mayhugh.

Holden retired from Texas Tech in 1970. During his retirement, he and Frances built the Adobe Row neighborhood of houses in Lubbock, Pueblo-revival style, to serve as inexpensive accommodations for faculty and students at Texas Tech. These buildings are listed in the National Register of Historic Places and are designated as state and city archaeological and historic landmarks.

Holden died on April 21, 1993, at the age of ninety-six.

William and Frances Holden are interred in the family plot with his parents and first wife at the City of Lubbock Cemetery. Frances's grave is not specifically marked. They were Methodist.

== Works ==
- Moisés, Rosalio; Kelley, Jane Holden; Holden, William Curry (1977) [1971]. A Yaqui Life: the personal chronicle of a Yaqui Indian. University of Nebraska Press.
- Rollie Burns: or, An account of the ranch industry on the south plains. Dallas, Tex.: Southwest Press. 1932.
- Spur ranch ; a study of the inclosed ranch phase of the cattle industry in Texas. Boston: Christopher Pub. House. 1934.
- A Ranching Saga: The Lives of William Electious Halsell and Ewing Halsell

== Further information ==
- Ruth Horn Andrews, The First Thirty Years: A History of Texas Technological College, 1925-1955. Lubbock: Texas Tech Press, 1956.
- "Book Notes", West Texas Historical Association Yearbook 69 (1993).
- William Holden obituary, Dallas Morning News, April 24, 1993.
- William Holden obituary, Lubbock Avalanche-Journal, April 22, 25, 1993.
- Jane Gilmore Rushing and Kline A. Knall, Evolution of a University: Texas Tech's First Fifty Years. Austin: Madrona, 1975.
- "William C. Holden", Who's Who in America, 1962–1963.
- "William C. Holden", Who's Who in the South and Southwest, Vol. 7.
- Oral history interviews with William Curry Holden, Southwest Collection/Special Collections Library, Texas Tech University
