= Carolyn Thompson =

Carolyn Thompson may refer to:

- Carolyn Thompson (basketball), American basketball player
- Carolyn Thompson (judge), American judge of the North Carolina Court of Appeals

== See also ==
- Carolyn Thompson Taylor, American academic and member of the Oklahoma House of Representatives
- Caroline Thompson, American novelist, screenwriter, film director, and producer
