= Brownfield, Texas =

- City
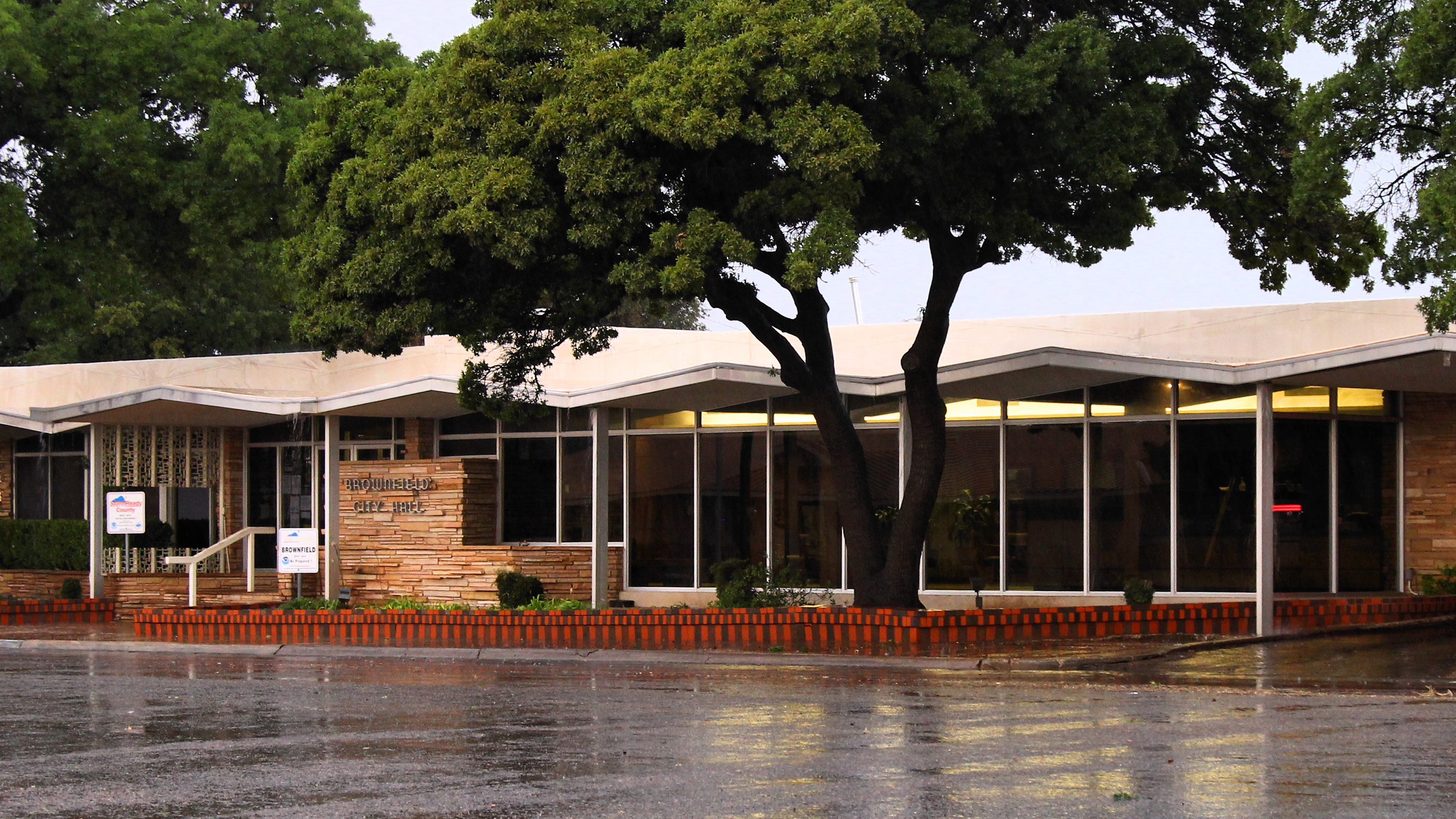
- Brownfield City Hall
- Interactive map of Brownfield, Texas
- Coordinates: 33°10′47″N 102°16′15″W
- Country: United States
- State: Texas
- County: Terry

Area
  - Total: 6.55 sq mi (16.97 km^{2})
  - Land: 6.51 sq mi (16.87 km^{2})
  - Water: 0.039 sq mi (0.10 km^{2})
- Elevation: 3,310 ft (1,009 m)

Population (2020)
  - Total: 8,936
  - Density: 1,372/sq mi (529.7/km^{2})
- Time zone: UTC−6 (Central (CST))
  - Summer (DST): UTC−5 (CDT)
- ZIP Code: 79316
- Area code: 806
- FIPS code: 48-10720
- GNIS feature ID: 1352989
- Website: www.ci.brownfield.tx.us

Brownfield is a city in and the county seat of Terry County, Texas, United States. Its population was 8,936 at the 2020 census. Brownfield is 39 miles (63 km) southwest of Lubbock.

== History ==
In 1903, town promoters W. G. Hardin and A. F. Small purchased the county's central lot, platted the site, and named the town after the Brownfield ranching family. To boost chances of becoming the county seat, they granted a lot to every county voter.

The town's early years saw the construction of essential structures, including the courthouse, school, and churches. Hill's Hotel became the first business, housing the inaugural post office. On June 28, 1904, Brownfield secured the county seat designation, narrowly defeating Gomez in an election. The Brownfield State Bank opened in 1905, serving multiple counties and parts of eastern New Mexico.

Brownfield was incorporated in 1920. Oil wells became operational in 1941, diversifying the town's economic landscape. In 1967, Minnie Hazel "Skip" Bowman, began producing a boxed edition of the card game Skip-Bo in Brownfield.

== Geography ==
According to the United States Census Bureau, Brownfield has an area of 6.3 sq mi (16 km^{2}), 0.32% of which is covered by water.

Brownfield lies in the center of Terry County, in the southern portion of the South Plains and Llano Estacado. The city rests on a windblown deposit called the Blackwater Draw Formation, which is underlain by a thick layer of caliche, referred to locally as the "caprock". Beneath the caliche layer lies fluvial deposits called the Ogallala Formation, which contains a portion of the Ogallala Aquifer. The Caprock Escarpment, about 50 miles east, forms a precipitous drop of about 1,000 feet (305 m) and exposes various geologic layers. In early days, climbing the Caprock Escarpment was not easy for horse-drawn covered wagons.

The only terrain variation lies at the south end of the city, where Lost Draw carves a channel that runs across the entire county. Lost Draw formed over 10,000 years ago at the end of the last ice age, when the climate of the area was much wetter. When the vast glaciers of the north retreated, they left numerous dry river channels crisscrossing the Llano Estacado. When settlers during the 1800s ventured across this area, they often went into these channels expecting to find water, but unless significant rains had occurred recently, their search was in vain, with many of the parties becoming "lost", hence the name, Lost Draw.

The most notable geographic feature of Brownfield is its red soil. The soil creates an almost iridescent red color during sunrise and sunset due to the high iron oxide content.

== Climate ==
Brownfield lies in a semiarid temperate zone, where high winds and extreme temperature variations are the norm. The summers reach over 100 °F (37.8 °C) for multiple consecutive days. The winters often fall below freezing for extended periods, but snow remains unusual due to very little precipitation forming in the winter.

The most significant time of the year for weather events starts in March and runs through September, when severe thunderstorms form on the Great Plains. Rain, winds, hail, and a few tornadoes are to be expected at this time of year. Late thunderstorms that produce hail are significantly harmful to the local economy, as it destroys the local cotton crop.

Climate data for Brownfield, Texas (1991–2020 normals, extremes 1953–present)
Month	Jan	Feb	Mar	Apr	May	Jun	Jul	Aug	Sep	Oct	Nov	Dec	Year
Record high °F (°C)	84 (29)	87 (31)	97 (36)	102 (39)	110 (43)	111 (44)	109 (43)	109 (43)	104 (40)	101 (38)	89 (32)	82 (28)	111 (44)
Mean maximum °F (°C)	75.0 (23.9)	79.9 (26.6)	86.8 (30.4)	91.9 (33.3)	98.8 (37.1)	103.0 (39.4)	101.8 (38.8)	100.5 (38.1)	97.4 (36.3)	92.1 (33.4)	82.7 (28.2)	75.1 (23.9)	105.0 (40.6)
Mean daily maximum °F (°C)	55.1 (12.8)	59.9 (15.5)	68.2 (20.1)	76.6 (24.8)	84.5 (29.2)	92.2 (33.4)	93.6 (34.2)	92.5 (33.6)	85.2 (29.6)	76.4 (24.7)	64.3 (17.9)	55.8 (13.2)	75.4 (24.1)
Daily mean °F (°C)	40.9 (4.9)	44.8 (7.1)	52.7 (11.5)	60.6 (15.9)	70.0 (21.1)	78.3 (25.7)	80.6 (27.0)	79.3 (26.3)	72.0 (22.2)	61.8 (16.6)	49.9 (9.9)	41.9 (5.5)	61.1 (16.2)
Mean daily minimum °F (°C)	26.7 (−2.9)	29.7 (−1.3)	37.2 (2.9)	44.6 (7.0)	55.5 (13.1)	64.5 (18.1)	67.5 (19.7)	66.1 (18.9)	58.7 (14.8)	47.3 (8.5)	35.6 (2.0)	28.0 (−2.2)	46.8 (8.2)
Mean minimum °F (°C)	14.7 (−9.6)	17.1 (−8.3)	22.0 (−5.6)	31.1 (−0.5)	41.6 (5.3)	56.0 (13.3)	61.7 (16.5)	60.0 (15.6)	47.0 (8.3)	32.0 (0.0)	21.1 (−6.1)	14.9 (−9.5)	10.7 (−11.8)
Record low °F (°C)	−8 (−22)	−1 (−18)	8 (−13)	22 (−6)	27 (−3)	45 (7)	53 (12)	52 (11)	36 (2)	15 (−9)	4 (−16)	−1 (−18)	−8 (−22)
Average precipitation inches (mm)	0.69 (18)	0.62 (16)	1.07 (27)	1.31 (33)	2.20 (56)	2.67 (68)	1.94 (49)	1.80 (46)	2.56 (65)	1.57 (40)	0.88 (22)	0.74 (19)	18.05 (458)
Average snowfall inches (cm)	1.4 (3.6)	1.2 (3.0)	0.3 (0.76)	0.0 (0.0)	0.0 (0.0)	0.0 (0.0)	0.0 (0.0)	0.0 (0.0)	0.0 (0.0)	0.1 (0.25)	0.8 (2.0)	1.2 (3.0)	5.0 (13)
Average precipitation days (≥ 0.01 in)	3.4	3.3	3.8	3.5	5.7	6.5	5.2	5.7	6.2	5.2	3.7	3.3	55.5
Average snowy days (≥ 0.1 in)	1.0	1.0	0.2	0.1	0.0	0.0	0.0	0.0	0.0	0.1	0.5	0.8	3.7
Source: NOAA

== Economy ==
Cotton farming is the backbone of Brownfield. Cotton fields stretch for miles, and the harvest season in October has harvesters (locally called cotton strippers), module builders, and module trucks all over the county.

A haze develops over the city as the local cotton gins go to work stripping the cotton from the burr, separating the seeds, and then compressing the cotton into 500-lb bales. The haze is actually fine cotton dust, and sometimes small drifts develop in the street resembling snow mixed with red soil.

Peanut growing has found a toehold on the economy, as have vineyards. In recent years, grape growing has made Terry County a producer of wine grapes used as filler for inexpensive wines. Several wineries are now established in the county, which produce average-to-poor quality wine according to numerous reviews and wine review aggregator websites. Local farmers, ranchers, and landowners began growing grapes here as early as 1950, with a few new wineries near the city due to the repeal of fully dry county status in 2008. Several older and more notable wineries are in the Lubbock area, about 30 miles northeast.

Oil production continues to drop from its previous levels in the 1980s. According to current trends, Terry County and Brownfield will continue to decline significantly in oil production and importance in West Texas.

Wal-Mart chose to not renew their lease on their facility on the eastern edge of town, saying the town was not sufficiently economically viable for them to continue to operate. The Jim Rudd Unit, a state prison, opened in 1995.

== Demographics ==
Historical population
Census	Pop.	Note	%±
1930	1,907		—
1940	4,009		110.2%
1950	6,161		53.7%
1960	10,286		67.0%
1970	9,647		−6.2%
1980	10,387		7.7%
1990	9,560		−8.0%
2000	9,488		−0.8%
2010	9,657		1.8%
2020	8,936		−7.5%
U.S. Decennial Census 2020

Brownfield and Terry County have one of the highest rates of teen pregnancy in Texas. The teen pregnancy rate is 98.1 out of 1000, more than double the national average.

Brownfield has an extremely high sexually transmitted infection rate of gonorrhea, chlamydia, and most notably syphilis, which is much higher than the state average (7.8 per 100,000).

=== 2020 census ===
As of the 2020 census, Brownfield had a population of 8,936, 3,035 households, and 2,086 families; the median age was 35.7 years, 26.6% of residents were under the age of 18, and 15.4% of residents were 65 years of age or older. For every 100 females there were 107.7 males, and for every 100 females age 18 and over there were 108.0 males.

92.2% of residents lived in urban areas, while 7.8% lived in rural areas.

Of the 3,035 households in Brownfield, 36.4% had children under the age of 18 living in them. Of all households, 45.6% were married-couple households, 17.5% were households with a male householder and no spouse or partner present, and 30.0% were households with a female householder and no spouse or partner present. About 27.0% of all households were made up of individuals, and 13.5% had someone living alone who was 65 years of age or older.

There were 3,628 housing units, of which 16.3% were vacant. Among occupied housing units, 65.0% were owner-occupied and 35.0% were renter-occupied. The homeowner vacancy rate was 3.2% and the rental vacancy rate was 12.7%.

Racial composition as of the 2020 census
Race	Percent
White	54.0%
Black or African American	5.0%
American Indian and Alaska Native	0.8%
Asian	0.4%
Native Hawaiian and Other Pacific Islander	0%
Some other race	16.1%
Two or more races	23.8%
Hispanic or Latino (of any race)	60.4%

Brownfield racial composition (NH = Non-Hispanic) (Note: Note: the US Census treats Hispanic/Latino as an ethnic category. This table excludes Latinos from the racial categories and assigns them to a separate category. Hispanics/Latinos can be of any race.)
Race	Number	Percentage
White (NH)	2,935	32.84%
Black or African American (NH)	383	4.29%
Native American or Alaska Native (NH)	25	0.28%
Asian (NH)	36	0.4%
Some Other Race (NH)	23	0.26%
Mixed/Multi-Racial (NH)	137	1.53%
Hispanic or Latino	5,397	60.4%
Total	8,936	

=== 2010 census ===
Only 61.5% of the population holds a high school degree or higher, 8.9% a bachelor's degree or higher, and 2.7% a master's degree or higher. About 6.1% of the population was unemployed in 2010.

=== 2000 census ===
As of the census of 2000, 9,488 people, 3,176 households, and 2,337 families resided in the city. The population density was 1,501.0 inhabitants per square mile (579.5/km^{2}). The 3,735 housing units had an average density of 590.9 per square mile (228.1/km^{2}). The racial makeup of the city was 24.56% White, 6.59% African American, 0.42% Native American, 0.25% Asian, 14.47% from other races, and 3.71% from two or more races. Hispanics of all origins contributed 45.95% of the population.

The city governance consists overwhelmingly of the White population, with only 23.4% of the council consisting of the minorities that are 75% of the population. The White representation is about 75% of the council, while only consisting of 24% of the population.

Of the 3,176 households, 34.6% had children under the age of 18 living with them, 55.3% were married couples living together, 14.1% had a female householder with no husband present, and 26.4% were not families. About 24% of all households were made up of individuals, and 14.3% had someone living alone who was 65 years of age or older. The average household size was 2.68 and the average family size was 3.19.

In the city, the population was distributed as 27.2% under the age of 18, 9.8% from 18 to 24, 27.3% from 25 to 44, 20.0% from 45 to 64, and 15.8% who were 65 years of age or older. The median age was 35 years. For every 100 females, there were 109.5 males. For every 100 females age 18 and over, there were 111.6 males.

The median income for a household in the city was $26,504, and for a family was $32,076. Males had a median income of $23,637 versus $19,628 for females. The per capita income for the city was $13,854. About 21.8% of families and 26.0% of the population were below the poverty line, including 38.7% of those under age 18 and 13.5% of those age 65 or over.

Brownfield is served by a weekly newspaper, nearby stations KBXJ (FM) and KPET (AM), and the various Lubbock radio and TV stations. KKUB (AM) and KTTU-FM are licensed to Brownfield, but operate primarily from offices and studios in Lubbock.

== Crime ==
As of 2019, violent and property crime rates were higher in Brownfield than the national average.

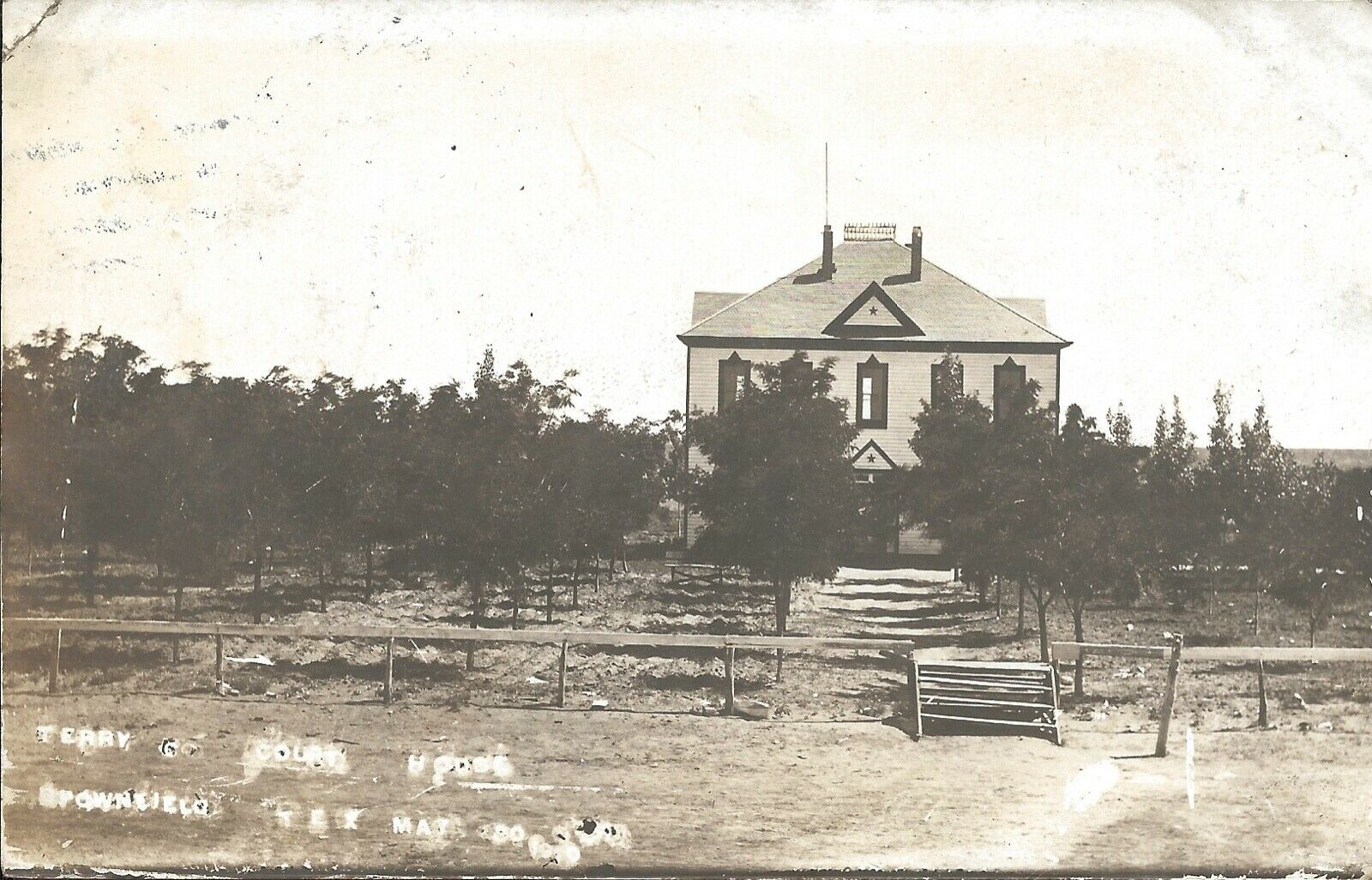
Terry County Courthouse was photographed for this postcard mailed in August 1910.

Brownfield News publisher, former head of the Brownfield Industrial Development Corporation (BIDCorps), and 1997 Brownfield High School graduate, Brian Brisendine, was convicted of receipt and distribution of child pornography, and sentenced to 12 years in federal prison on September 8, 2022. Brisendine admitted to trading images of child sexual abuse online since 2014. He admitted to viewing between 5,000 and 10,000 videos and images of child sexual abuse with children as young as four months old.

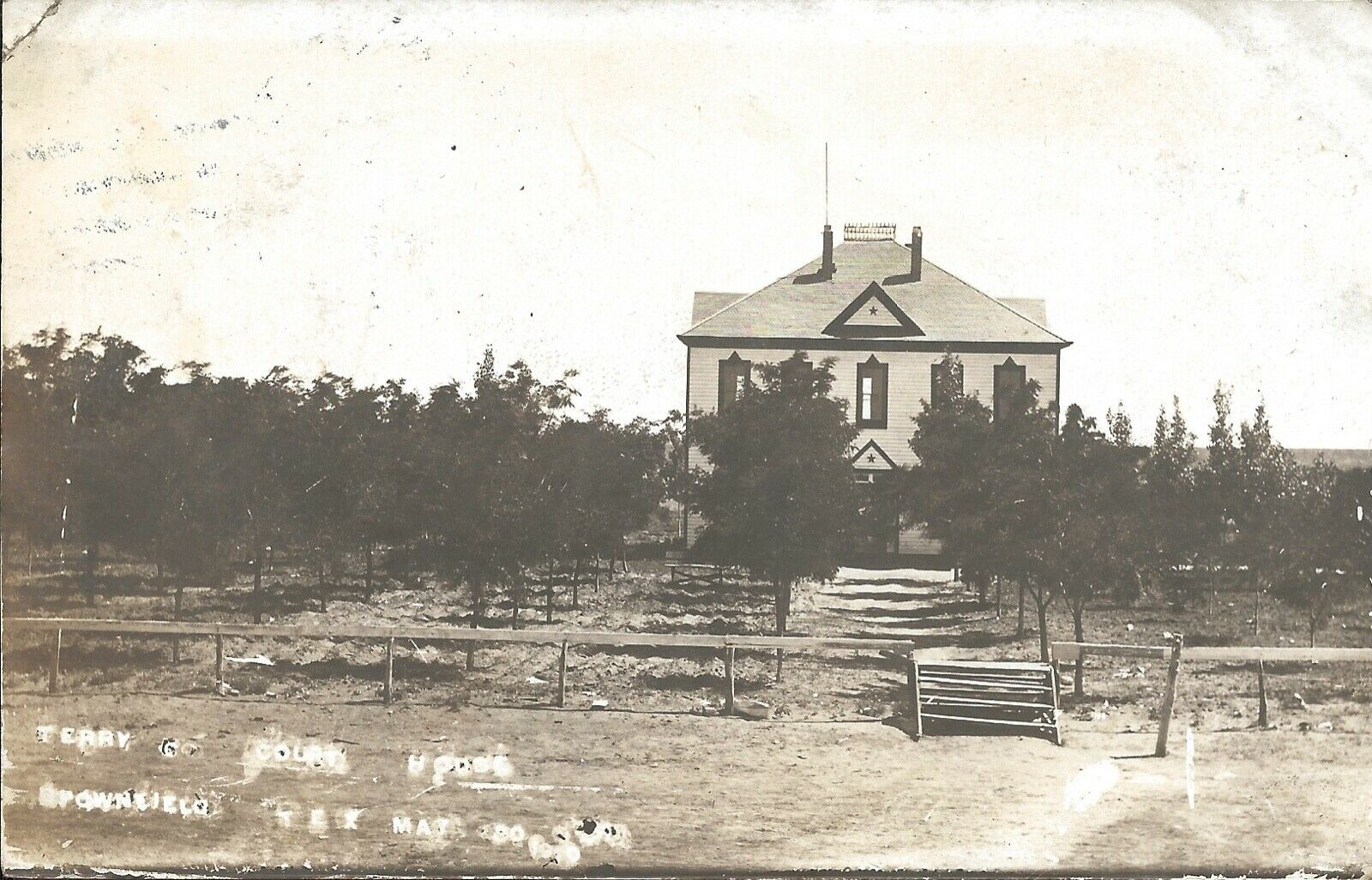
Terry County Courthouse was photographed for this postcard mailed in August 1910.

== Education ==
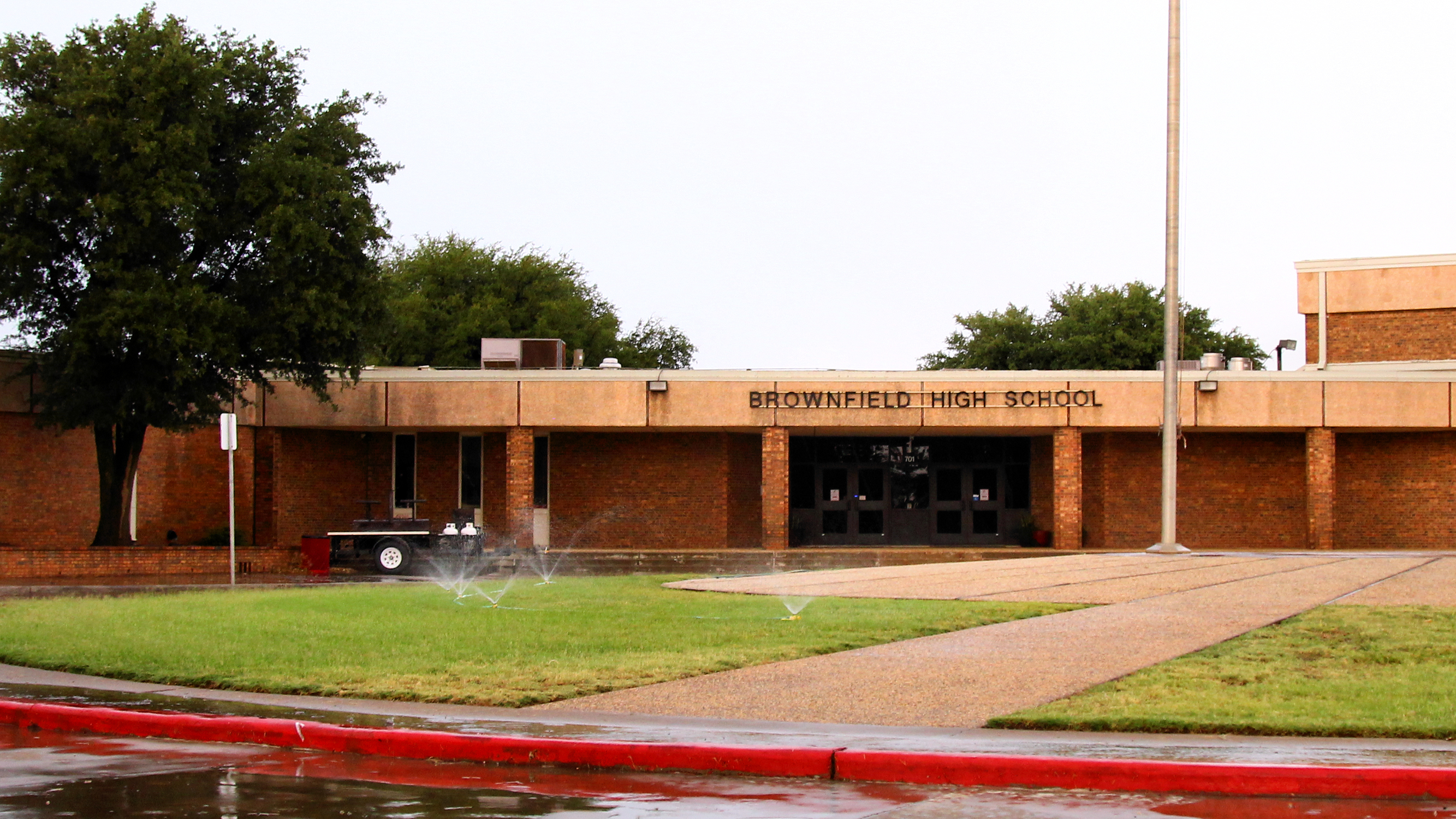
Brownfield High School

The City of Brownfield is served by the Brownfield Independent School District, ranked 899 out of 932 districts in Texas and receiving a zero-star rating. Brownfield ISD is considered a historically low-performing school district with abnormally high teacher turnover according to the local newspaper.

Brownfield High School was rated "academically unacceptable" by the Texas State Board of Education in 2011.

For the 2012–2013 school year, Brownfield High School State of Texas Assessments of Academic Readiness test scores resulted in the following student passing scores:

- 23% of students passed writing
- 45% of students passed algebra
- 67% of students passed biology
- 54% of students passed chemistry
- 48% of students passed reading
- 19% of students passed geography

For the 2021–2022 school year, Brownfield High School was ranked among the bottom 15% of all high schools in Texas, placing 1414th out of 1861.

For the 2024-2025 school year, Brownfield High School test results show that only 27% of the student population showed proficiency in math and reading.

== Media ==
- KHLK: Christian FM station
- KKUB: Spanish-language Catholic AM station
- KPBB: Former Spanish-language Christian FM station

== Transportation ==
Brownfield, situated at the crossroads of U.S. highways 62, 82, 380, and 385, as well as Texas State Highway 137. The West Texas and Lubbock Railway connects the area to Lubbock.

== Dry county status ==
Several town meetings were held in 2008 to discuss the issue of selling beer and wine in Terry County. On November 4, a majority of registered voters voted to legalize the sale of beer and wine in Terry County (1533 for, 1211 against).

== See also ==
- West Texas
- U.S. Route 82 in Texas
- West Texas Running Club
