= Lubbock Lake Landmark =

Archaeological site in Texas, United States

- Lubbock Lake Site
- U.S. National Register of Historic Places
- U.S. National Historic Landmark
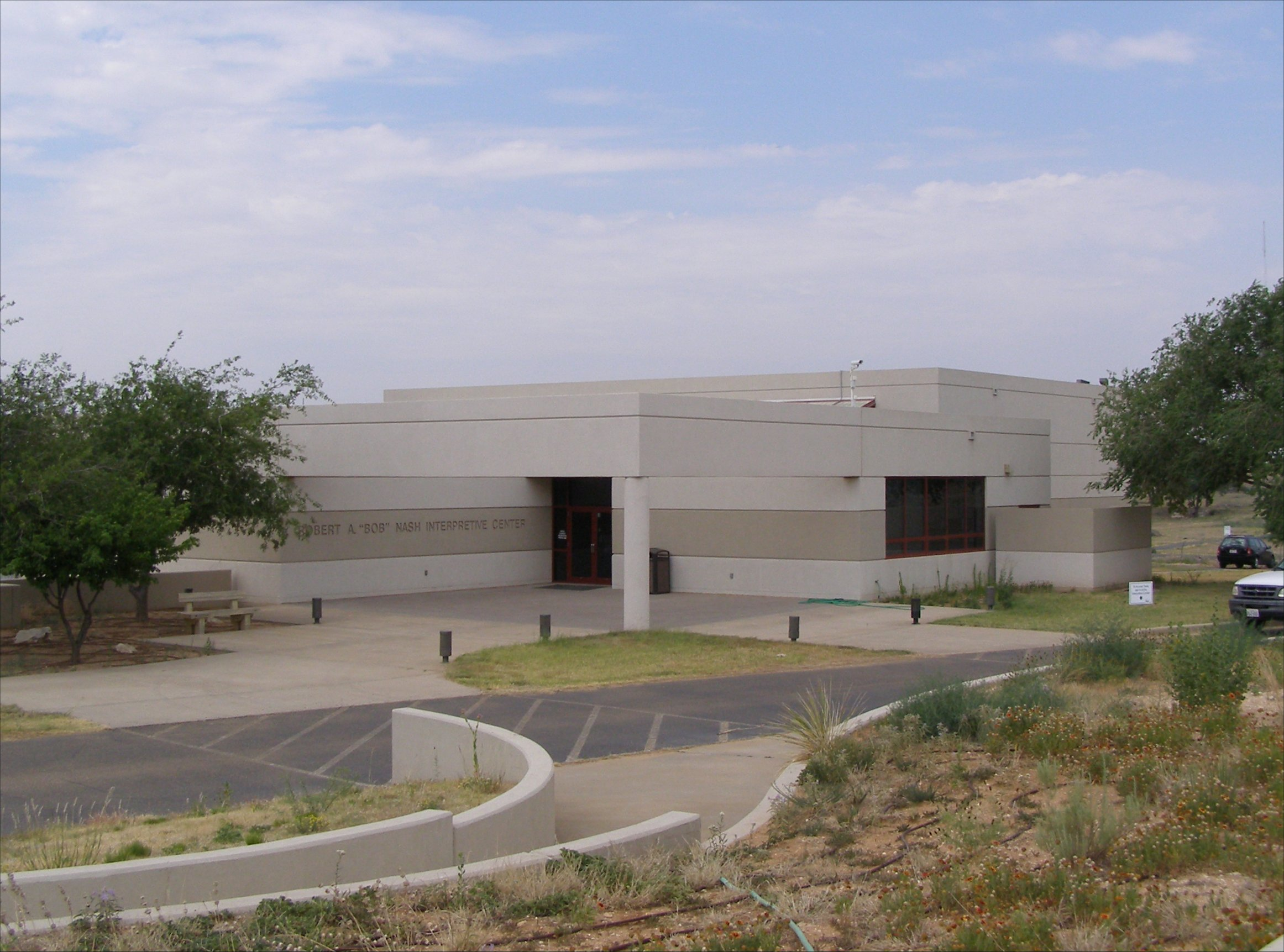
- Visitor center and museum

- Location within Texas Location within the United States
- Nearest city: Lubbock, Texas
- Coordinates: 33°37′19″N 101°53′23″W
- Area: 300 acres (120 ha)
- NRHP reference No.: 71000948

Significant dates
- Added to NRHP: June 21, 1971
- Designated NHL: December 22, 1977

Lubbock Lake Landmark, also known as Lubbock Lake Site, is an important archeological site and natural history preserve in the city of Lubbock, Texas, United States. The protected state and federal landmark is 336 acres (136 ha). Evidence of ancient people and extinct animals is at Lubbock Lake Landmark, with evidence of nearly 12,000 years of use by ancient cultures on the Llano Estacado. It is part of the Museum of Texas Tech University.

Visitors can watch active archeological digs. Volunteers from around the world help with the ongoing excavations each summer, and local people can volunteer also, making the site accessible for nonscientists. Both guided and self-guided tours are offered throughout the year. The site is listed on the National Register of Historic Places and is a designated national historic and state archeological Landmark.

== History ==
Lubbock Lake is in a meander of the Yellow House Draw, also known as "Punta de Agua", a tributary of the Brazos River, near ancient springs. People on the Llano Estacado used the water resources in the draw until those resources went dry in the early 1930s. In 1936, the City of Lubbock dredged the meander in an effort to make it a usable water supply. These efforts were unsuccessful, but brought to light the archeological significance of the site. Very little standing water and no lake remain at the site.

The first explorations of the site were conducted in 1939 by the West Texas Museum, now the Museum of Texas Tech University. In 1936, Clark Kimmel and Turner Kimmel found projectile points from Firemen's Reservoir. In the late 1940s, several Folsom period (10,800-10,300 years ago) bison kills were discovered. At one location of an ancient bison kill from a then-unidentified Paleo-Indian group, charred bison bones produced the first radiocarbon date, which is still the most accurate form of dating for Paleo-Indian material (about 9,800 years old).

== Geology ==
The bedrock of Lubbock Lake is part of the Blanco Formation, which is a subset of Pleistocene deposits. Here, it is composed mostly of a large deposit of lake sediments about two million years old. Above the Blanco Formation is the Blackwater Draw Formation, a sheet of wind-deposited sediment that covers most of the region. This deposit slowly accumulated between 1 million and 50,000 years ago. The dune, in the northeastern section of Lubbock Lake, contains sediments and buried soils from at least 36,000 years ago. Yellow House Draw had developed by 20,000 years ago, cutting through the Blackwater Draw Formation and into the Blanco Formation. By about 12,000 years before the present (10,000 BC), the draw had cut a bend about 15 m (49 ft) deep in the area of the landmark.

Evidence points to a drying trend occurring at Lubbock Lake over the last 11,000 years. The geologic record begins with stream deposits, followed by lake sedimentation, and finishes between 6,500 and 4,500 years ago with the deposit of windblown sediments during a period of severe drought. After 4,500 years ago, the climate became much like it is now, with only minor changes in the past 2,000 years.

== Archaeology ==
The site clearly shows many levels of cultural deposits that can be dated accurately due to the presence of clear geological stratigraphy (layers of various sediments representing different periods of time). From these deposits, nearly 175 radiocarbon dates are available. The Lubbock Lake Landmark exhibits a virtually complete cultural sequence from the Clovis period to historic times. These periods are easily distinguished due to the separation of sediment layers containing cultural material by sterile layers where sediment lacks artifacts.

Each layer represents a different time period, water regimen, group of plants and animals, group of peoples, and climate and environment covering the past 12,000 years of history and prehistory. The time of people in North America generally is divided into five cultural periods, all of which are represented at Lubbock Lake Landmark.

Paleolithic cultural periods:

The Paleo-Indian period:

- Clovis (11,500-11,000 years ago)
- Folsom (10,800-10,300 years ago)
- Plainview (10,000 years ago)
- Firstview (8,600 years ago)

Neolithic to modern cultural periods:

- Archaic (8,500–2000 years ago)
- Ceramic (2,000–500 years ago)
- Protohistoric (500–300 years ago)
- Historic (300 years ago to modern times)

== Cultural periods represented ==
=== Paleo Indian ===
Material from the Clovis period has been found on a gravel bar of the once-active stream in the ancient river valley. Excavations have uncovered the remains of several extinct animals - mammoth, two types of horses, camel, ancient bison, giant short-faced bear, and giant armadillo-like Pampatheriidae. This material has been recovered from an area where secondary butchering of parts of carcasses took place and mammoth bones were broken to secure pieces to use or make into tools. Folsom and later Paleo-Indian peoples hunted and killed ancient bison around the ponds and marshes in the draw. Locations where bison were both killed and butchered are called kill/butchering locales. Hunters were known to disguise themselves as wolves and slowly creep up on the bison before springing up and attacking.

=== Archaic ===
The Archaic period of the Llano Estacado is poorly understood. Several bone beds containing bison and pronghorn remains have been found in the windblown and stream deposits of this stratum at the landmark. A bison kill dating from the Early Archaic and a baking "oven" dating to the Middle Archaic have been discovered. This oven actually was a large oval pit that contained burned rock and ash. The absence of bone has led researchers to believe it was used for processing vegetal matter. Radiocarbon dating has determined the oven to be about 5,000 years old. Several Late Archaic camps have been uncovered. A camp generally is represented by hearths (campfires), scattered hearthstones, discarded tools, and scattered remains of small animals consumed as food.

=== Ceramic ===
Broken Puebloan and Mogollon tradeware pottery have been found in the Ceramic levels. Archaeological features include camp sites with scattered stone tools, flakes (small segments of stone that are the result of toolmaking), broken bones, and hearths. Excavation of processing stations from this period have produced the remains of modern bison, coyote, wolf, and pronghorn.

=== Protohistoric ===
The Protohistoric period is a transitional one. It extends from the time just prior to contact through first contact with Europeans. Spanish explorers were in the area during the later Protohistoric period, but their presence had no detectable influence on the native cultures or archaeological remains. The Apaches are known to have been in the area from at least 1450 to the mid-18th century.

=== Historic ===
The Historic period begins when contact with Europeans was established. Excavated Historic deposits indicate the presence of modern horses, as well as metal and glass. The Apache were displaced from the area by the Comanches, who roamed the Llano Estacado from the mid-18th century to the 1870s. Information derived through excavation of sites from these time periods can be compared to historical records to provide a clearer understanding of the lifeways and population movements of these native peoples.

Evidence of Anglo-American habitation has been found in the most recent archaeological deposits. Some of these artifacts reflect the use of this area by the bison (buffalo) hunters in the 1870s. Artifacts such as rifle cartridges, metal hardware, square nails, buttons, and a ginger beer bottle represent George Singer's store and home of the early 1880s. The Singer store was the first commercial business for the area. Located at the edge of what was then called Long Lake and the crossing of two military trails, the store was built near the springs as a trading post for early settlers and cattle ranchers in the area. It was in operation from 1881 to 1886, when it burned down; the store was rebuilt further downstream. The Singer store was the beginning of the modern city of Lubbock.

== See also ==
- Blackwater Draw
- Blanco Canyon
- Caprock Escarpment
- Double Mountain Fork Brazos River
- Duffy's Peak
- Llano Estacado
- Lubbock Subpluvial
- Mount Blanco
- Mushaway Peak
- Palo Duro Canyon
- West Texas
- Yellow House Canyon

== Related ==
- National Register of Historic Places listings in Lubbock County, Texas
- List of National Historic Landmarks in Texas
