= West Texas Running Club =

WTRC Logo

The West Texas Running Club (WTRC), founded in 1972 by Gene Adams and James Morris, has grown into the foremost running organization in West Texas, with over 300 members. WTRC conducts 13 events each year.

== History ==
The WTRC started in Brownfield. In 1972 Gene Adams moved to Brownfield from Tulsa and learned there was not a local running club. He still wished to continue running and began at the Brownfield High School track. This is where he came in contact with James Morris the Brownfield High School track coach. They became friends and decided to start a running club in the area. Because Brownfield was a small community they decided to make their running club appeal to runners throughout the West Texas region. During the Summer of 1972 at the Brownfield Firecracker Race Gene and James convinced a few other runners to join their club. The WTRC organized its first race shortly thereafter. Today the Majority of WTRC members are from Lubbock but races are still held in Brownfield.

== Races ==
Races are held at least once a month and include:

- Loop The Lake
- February Freeze
- Prairie Dog Town Run
- Moonlight Run
- Horseshoe Bend Run
- Bobby Birdsong Memorial Run
- Firecracker Run
- HOT Dam Run
- Shallowater Stampede
- Red Raider Road Race
- Buffalo Wallow Races
- Turkey Trot Races
- Toys For Tots-Redline Cross Country Run

== Challenge Series ==
The WTRC Challenge Series is a 12 month series of 13 races culminating in year-end awards and recognition for performance, endurance and participation by club members in monthly club races.

=== 66 Mile Club ===
All members completing 66 miles in qualifying events will receive an award denoting that achievement.

=== Mileage Award ===
Presented to the male and female members who accumulate the most miles for the year in qualifying events.

=== Participation Award ===
Presented to the female and male members who participate in the greatest number of qualifying events.

=== Volunteer Of The Year ===
Up to three awards are given to those Non runners who help the most at club sanctioned events.

=== Victor's Rankings ===
Points are earned at each qualifying event in different age and sex classes. Awards are presented to a minimum of 3 and up to 5 of the top point scorers in each division at the end of the year.

== Red Raider Road Race Scholarships ==
The WTRC awards stipends of up to $500 per semester to Texas Tech University Students. They are awarded based on the following criteria: participation in extracurricular activities, participation in school activities, leadership positions held, academic record and financial need. Special consideration is given to candidates who participate in activities that are consistent with the goals of the club.

== Organization ==
The WTRC is headed by the current President, Jonathan Botros.

== Membership ==
WTRC membership include a monthly newsletter that contains injury and training tips, club news, and race results. It also includes membership in the Road Runners Club of America (RRCA).
