= Texas Tech Lady Raiders basketball =

College women's basketball team representing Texas Tech University

2026–27 Texas Tech Lady Raiders basketball team
- University: Texas Tech
- Head coach: Krista Gerlich (7th season)
- Location: Lubbock, Texas
- Arena: United Supermarkets Arena (capacity: 15,020)
- Conference: Big 12
- Nickname: Lady Raiders
- Colors: Scarlet and black

NCAA Division I tournament champions
- 1993
Other NCAA Division I tournament results
Final Four	1993
Elite Eight	1993, 1995, 2000, 2003
Sweet Sixteen	1992, 1993, 1994, 1995, 1996, 1999, 2000, 2001, 2002, 2003, 2005
Appearances	1984, 1986, 1990, 1991, 1992, 1993, 1994, 1995, 1996, 1997, 1998, 1999, 2000, 2001, 2002, 2003, 2004, 2005, 2011, 2013, 2026

Conference tournament champions
- 1992, 1993, 1995, 1998, 1999

Conference regular-season champions
- 1992, 1993, 1994, 1995, 1996, 1998, 1999, 2000

Uniforms
Home	Away	Alternate

The Texas Tech Lady Raiders basketball team represents Texas Tech University and competes in the Big 12 Conference of NCAA Division I.

== History ==
The 1975–76 season saw the debut of women's basketball at Texas Tech University. In 1993, the team won the NCAA Division I women's basketball tournament.

== Home arenas ==
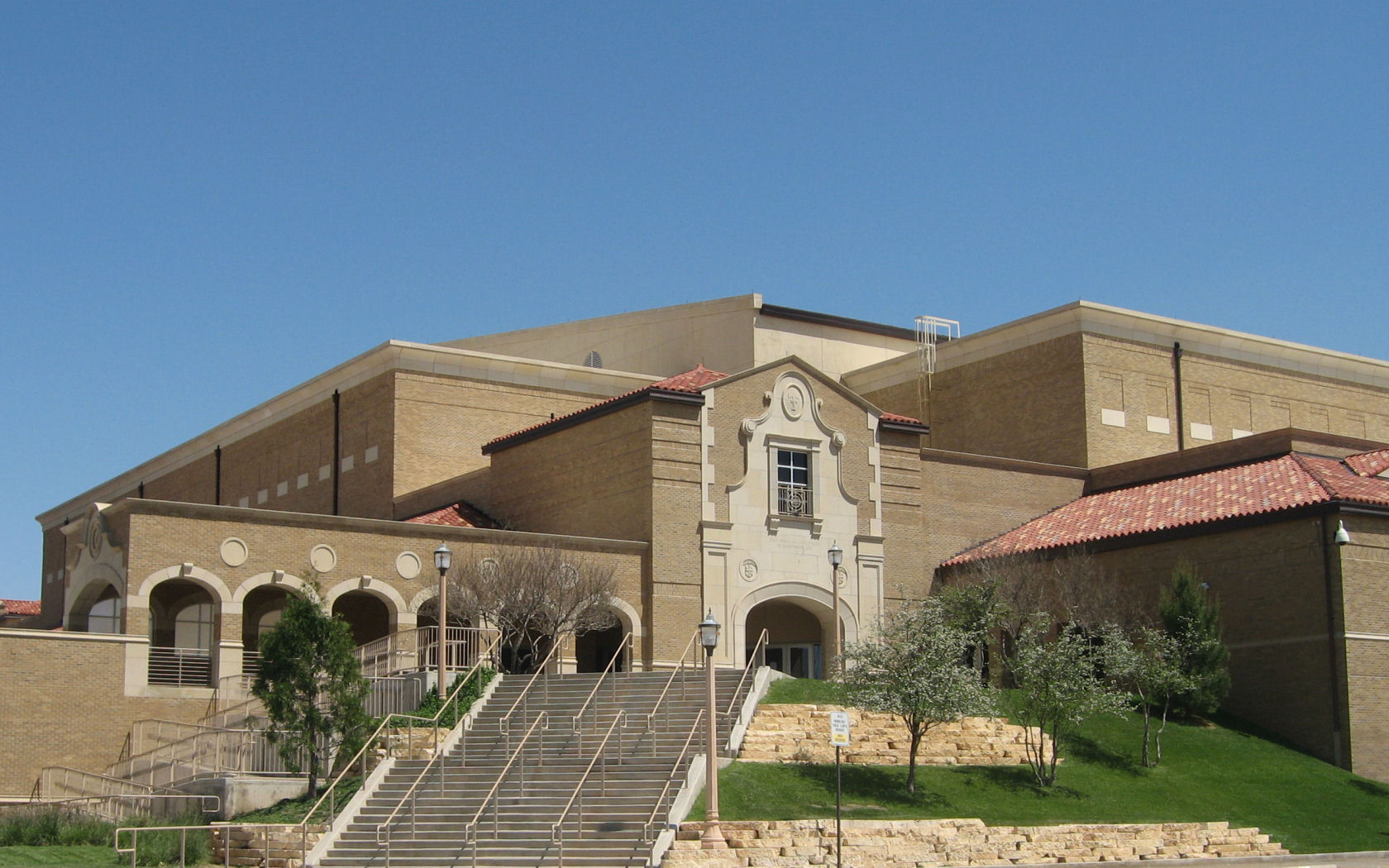
United Supermarkets Arena

All six home games were played at the on campus Women's Gym during the Lady Raiders' inaugural 1975–76 season. The following two seasons, the Lady Raiders began playing select home games along the Red Raiders basketball team at Lubbock Municipal Coliseum. By the 1978–79 season, the team no longer split time between the two venues, playing only at Lubbock Municipal Coliseum until the United Supermarkets Arena opened in time for the 1999–2000 season.

== Players ==
=== Retired jerseys ===
Retired basketball jerseys
Number	Player	Seasons
21	Krista Kirkland-Gerlich	1989–1993
22	Sheryl Swoopes	1991–1993
44	Carolyn Thompson	1980–1984

== Year-by-year results ==
Season	Team	Overall	Conference	Standing	Postseason	Coaches' poll	AP poll
AIAW (1975–1982)
1975–76	Susie Lynch	14–16	–		AIAW State Tournament		
1976–77	Susie Lynch	20–18	–		AIAW State Tournament		
1977–78	Gay Benson	35–11	–		AIAW Regional		
1978–79	Gay Benson	8–25 (Note: The on-court record in 1978-79 was 14-19 but due to forfeits the official record is 8-25)	–		AIAW Regional		
1979–80	Gay Benson	24–11	–		AIAW Regional		
1980–81	Donna Wick	13–17 (Note: The on–court record in 1980–81 was 12–18 but due to forfeits the official record is 13–17)	–		AIAW State Tournament		
1981–82	Donna Wick	18–12	–		AIAW Regional		
Southwest (1982–1996)
1982–83	Marsha Sharp	22–9	6–2	T–2nd	NWIT Fifth Place		
1983–84	Marsha Sharp	23–7	13–3	2nd	NCAA First Round		
1984–85	Marsha Sharp	24–8	12–4	2nd	NWIT Third Place		19
1985–86	Marsha Sharp	21–9	13–3	2nd	NCAA Second Round	21	
1986–87	Marsha Sharp	18–11	10–6	T–3rd			
1987–88	Marsha Sharp	17–13	9–7	3rd			
1988–89	Marsha Sharp	16–13	9–7	3rd			
1989–90	Marsha Sharp	20–11	11–5	3rd	NCAA First Round		
1990–91	Marsha Sharp	23–8	12–4	3rd	NCAA First Round		
1991–92	Marsha Sharp	27–5	13–1	1st	NCAA Sixteen	15	12
1992–93	Marsha Sharp	31–3	13–1	T–1st	NCAA Champions	1	5
1993–94	Marsha Sharp	28–5	12–2	1st	NCAA Sixteen	11	9
1994–95	Marsha Sharp	33–4	13–1	1st	NCAA Quarterfinals	7	5
1995–96	Marsha Sharp	27–5	13–1	1st	NCAA Sixteen	12	9
Big 12 (1996–Present)
1996–97	Marsha Sharp	20–9	11–5	4th	NCAA Second Round	19	17
1997–98	Marsha Sharp	26–5	15–1	1st	NCAA Second Round	10	6
1998–99	Marsha Sharp	30–4	14–2	1st	NCAA Sixteen	6	6
1999–2000	Marsha Sharp	28–5	13–3	T–1st	NCAA Quarterfinals	7	11
2000–01	Marsha Sharp	25–7	13–3	2nd	NCAA Sixteen	11	13
2001–02	Marsha Sharp	20–12	8–8	7th	NCAA Sixteen	12	17
2002–03	Marsha Sharp	29–6	13–3	3rd	NCAA Quarterfinals	6	7
2003–04	Marsha Sharp	25–8	10–6	T–4th	NCAA Second Round	17	14
2004–05	Marsha Sharp	24–8	12–4	T–3rd	NCAA Sixteen	12	14
2005–06	Marsha Sharp	15–14	9–7	5th			
2006–07	Kristy Curry	15–16	6–10	T–7th			
2007–08	Kristy Curry	17–16	4–12	T–10th	WNIT Sixteen		
2008–09	Kristy Curry	16–15	6–10	T–7th			
2009–10	Kristy Curry	18–15	5–11	T–8th	WNIT Second Round		
2010–11	Kristy Curry	22–11	8–8	6th	NCAA First Round		
2011–12	Kristy Curry	21–14	6–12	9th	WNIT Sixteen		
2012–13	Kristy Curry	21–11	11–7	T–3rd	NCAA First Round		
2013–14	Candace Whitaker	7–24	0–18	10th			
2014–15	Candace Whitaker	15–16	5–13	10th			
2015–16	Candace Whitaker	13–18	3–15	9th			
2016–17	Candace Whitaker	14–17	5–13	8th			
2017–18	Candace Whitaker (6–7); Shimmy Gray-Miller (1–16)	7–23	1–17	10th			
2018–19	Marlene Stollings	14–17	4–14	T–8th			
2019–20	Marlene Stollings	17–10	6–10	6th			
2020–21	Krista Gerlich	10–15	5–13	7th			
2021–22	Krista Gerlich	11–18	4–14	8th			
2022–23	Krista Gerlich	20–14	6–12	8th	WNIT Super 16		
2023–24	Krista Gerlich	17–16	5–13	T–11th			
2024–25	Krista Gerlich	19–18	4–14	T–12th	WBIT Quarterfinal		
Total:		991–592					
National champion Postseason invitational champion Conference regular season champion Conference regular season and conference tournament champion Division regular season champion Division regular season and conference tournament champion Conference tournament champion

== NCAA tournament results ==
The Lady Raiders have appeared in 21 NCAA Tournaments, with a record of 31–20.

Year	Seed	Round	Opponent	Result
1984	#8	First Round	#1 Louisiana Tech	L 68−94
1986	#6	Second Round	#3 Long Beach State	L 73−78 (OT)
1990	#12	First Round	#5 Northern Illinois	L 63−84
1991	#9	First Round	#8 UNLV	L 65−70
1992	#4	Second Round; Sweet Sixteen	#12 Santa Clara #1 Stanford	W 64−58; L 63–75
1993	#2	Second Round; Sweet Sixteen; Elite Eight; Final Four; Title Game	#7 Washington #3 Southern Cal #4 Colorado #1 Vanderbilt #1 Ohio State	W 70−64; W 87–67; W 79–54; W 60–46; W 84–82
1994	#2	First Round; Second Round; Sweet Sixteen	#15 Missouri #10 Creighton #6 Alabama	W 75−61; W 75–64; L 68–73
1995	#2	First Round; Second Round; Sweet Sixteen; Elite Eight	#15 Tulane #10 Wisconsin #3 Washington #1 Tennessee	W 87−72; W 88–65; W 67–52; L 59–80
1996	#4	First Round; Second Round; Sweet Sixteen	#13 Portland #12 Notre Dame #1 Louisiana Tech	W 78−61; W 82–67; L 55–66
1997	#8	First Round; Second Round	#9 Montana #1 Stanford	W 47−45; L 45–67
1998	#1	First Round; Second Round	#16 Grambling State #9 Notre Dame	W 87−75; L 59–74
1999	#2	First Round; Second Round; Sweet Sixteen	#15 Stephen F. Austin #10 NC State #3 Rutgers	W 80−54; W 85–78; L 43–52
2000	#3	First Round; Second Round; Sweet Sixteen; Elite Eight	#14 Tennessee Tech #6 Tulane #2 Notre Dame #1 Tennessee	W 83−54; W 76–59; W 69–65; L 44–57
2001	#2	First Round; Second Round; Sweet Sixteen	#15 Penn #7 Virginia Tech #3 Purdue	W 100−57; W 73–52; L 72–74
2002	#4	First Round; Second Round; Sweet Sixteen	#13 Stephen F. Austin #12 Mississippi State #1 Oklahoma	W 84−63; W 77–55; L 62–72
2003	#2	First Round; Second Round; Sweet Sixteen; Elite Eight	#15 Missouri State #7 UC Santa Barbara #6 New Mexico #1 Duke	W 67−59; W 71–48; W 81–76; L 79–80
2004	#4	First Round; Second Round	#13 Maine #5 Louisiana Tech	W 60−50; L 64–81
2005	#4	First Round; Second Round; Sweet Sixteen	#13 UT–Arlington #12 Middle Tenn #1 Tennessee	W 69−49; W 80–69; L 59–75
2011	#8	First Round	#9 St. John's	L 50−55
2013	#7	First Round	#10 South Florida	L 70−71
2026	#7	First Round; Second Round	#10 Villanova #2 LSU	W 57−52; L 47−101

== See also ==
- List of Texas Tech Lady Raiders in the WNBA draft
