= Carolyn Thompson (basketball) =

American basketball player

Carolyn Thompson is an American former Texas Tech basketball player, playing from 1980 to 1984. She was born in Hobbs, New Mexico.

With a career total of 2,655 points, Thompson is the all-time leading scorer for the Texas Tech Lady Raiders and is ranked second in points per game with 21.9 (as of the end of the 2007 season). She set a total of eighteen records at Tech, including field goals made (1,013), field goal attempts (1,944), and rebounds (1,247). In each of her four seasons at the school, she scored at least 600 points. Her best scoring season was during her senior year when she recorded 707 points.

Thompson is one of only three Lady Raiders to have her jersey retired. The others are Sheryl Swoopes and Krista Kirkland-Gerlich.

In 2014, Thompson was inducted into the Southwest Conference Hall of Fame.

== Texas Tech statistics ==
Legend
GP	Games played	GS	Games started	MPG	Minutes per game
FG%	Field goal percentage	3P%	3-point field goal percentage	FT%	Free throw percentage
RPG	Rebounds per game	APG	Assists per game	SPG	Steals per game
BPG	Blocks per game	PPG	Points per game	**Bold**	Career high

Year	Team	GP	Points	FG%	FT%	RPG	PPG
1981	Texas Tech	30	610	.473	.613	**12.0**	20.3
1982	Texas Tech	30	639	.499	.606	11.0	21.3
1983	Texas Tech	**31**	699	.538	.645	9.1	22.5
1984	Texas Tech	30	**707**	**.574**	**.708**	9.1	**23.6**
Career		121	2,655	.521	.638	10.3	21.9

== See also ==
- List of NCAA Division I women's basketball players with 2,500 points and 1,000 rebounds
