= KHLK =

- Brownfield, Texas; United States
- Broadcast area: Lubbock, Texas
- Frequency: 104.3 MHz
- Branding: KHCB Radio Network

Programming
- Format: Christian radio

Ownership
- Owner: Houston Christian Broadcasters, Inc.

History
- First air date: November 12, 1984
- Former call signs: DKLCU (1993–1993); KLCU (1993–1993); KLZK (1993–1996); DKLZK (1996–1996); KLZK (1996–2002); KJTV-FM (2002–2002); KLZK (2002–2008); KSTQ-FM (2008–2009); KTTU-FM (2009–2015); KEJS (2015–2019)

Technical information
- Licensing authority: FCC
- Facility ID: 61581
- Class: C2
- ERP: 50,000 watts
- HAAT: 145 meters (476 ft)
- Transmitter coordinates: 33°25′3.0″N 102°8′51.0″W

Links
- Public license information: Public file; LMS
- Website: khcb.org

KHLK is a Christian radio formatted broadcast radio station licensed to Brownfield, Texas, serving Lubbock, Texas. KHLK is owned and operated by Houston Christian Broadcasters, Inc.

== History ==
On March 1, 2019 Barton Broadcasting sold Tejano music KEJS-FM POWER 104.3 to Houston Christian Broadcasters, Inc. obtain and acquired the FM station for $225,000, which operates as its primary station KHCB-FM in Houston and change its call sign to KHLK and format to Christian radio.
