= KPBB =

Brownfield, Texas; United States
- Frequency: 88.5 MHz
- Branding: La Radio Cristiana

Programming
- Format: Defunct (was Spanish Religious)

Ownership
- Owner: Paulino Bernal Evangelism

Technical information
- Licensing authority: FCC
- Facility ID: 88314
- Class: A
- ERP: 4,500 watts
- HAAT: 115.0 meters
- Transmitter coordinates: 33°9′18.00″N 102°16′51.00″W

Links
- Public license information: Public file; LMS

KPBB (88.5 FM) was a radio station broadcasting a Spanish Religious format. Licensed to Brownfield, Texas, United States, the station was owned by Paulino Bernal Evangelism. KPBB's license was cancelled on June 26, 2013.
