= Museum of Texas Tech University =

Museum at Texas Tech University
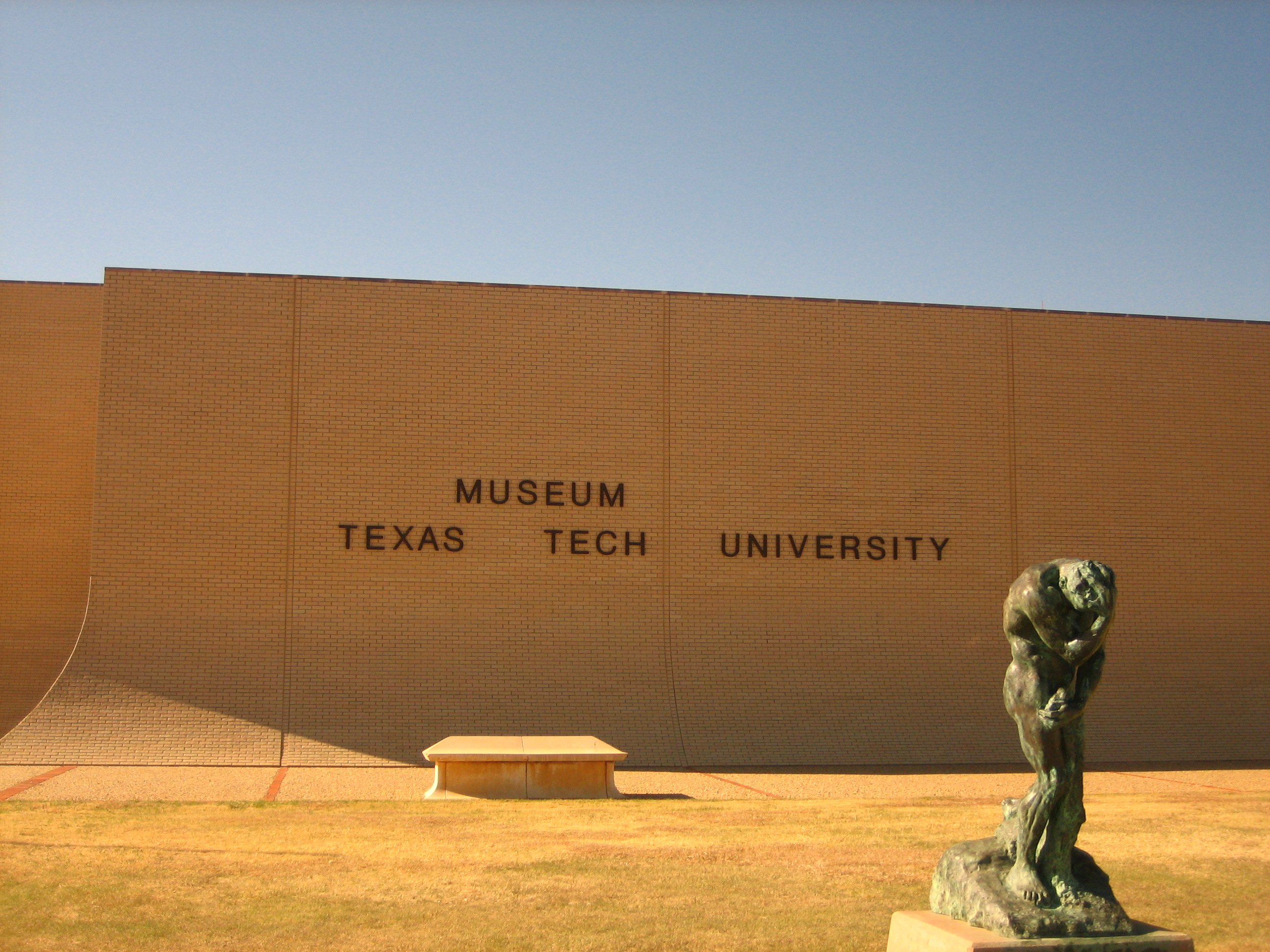
- Established: 1929
- Location: Lubbock, Texas, U.S.
- Type: University museum
- Website: www.depts.ttu.edu/museumttu

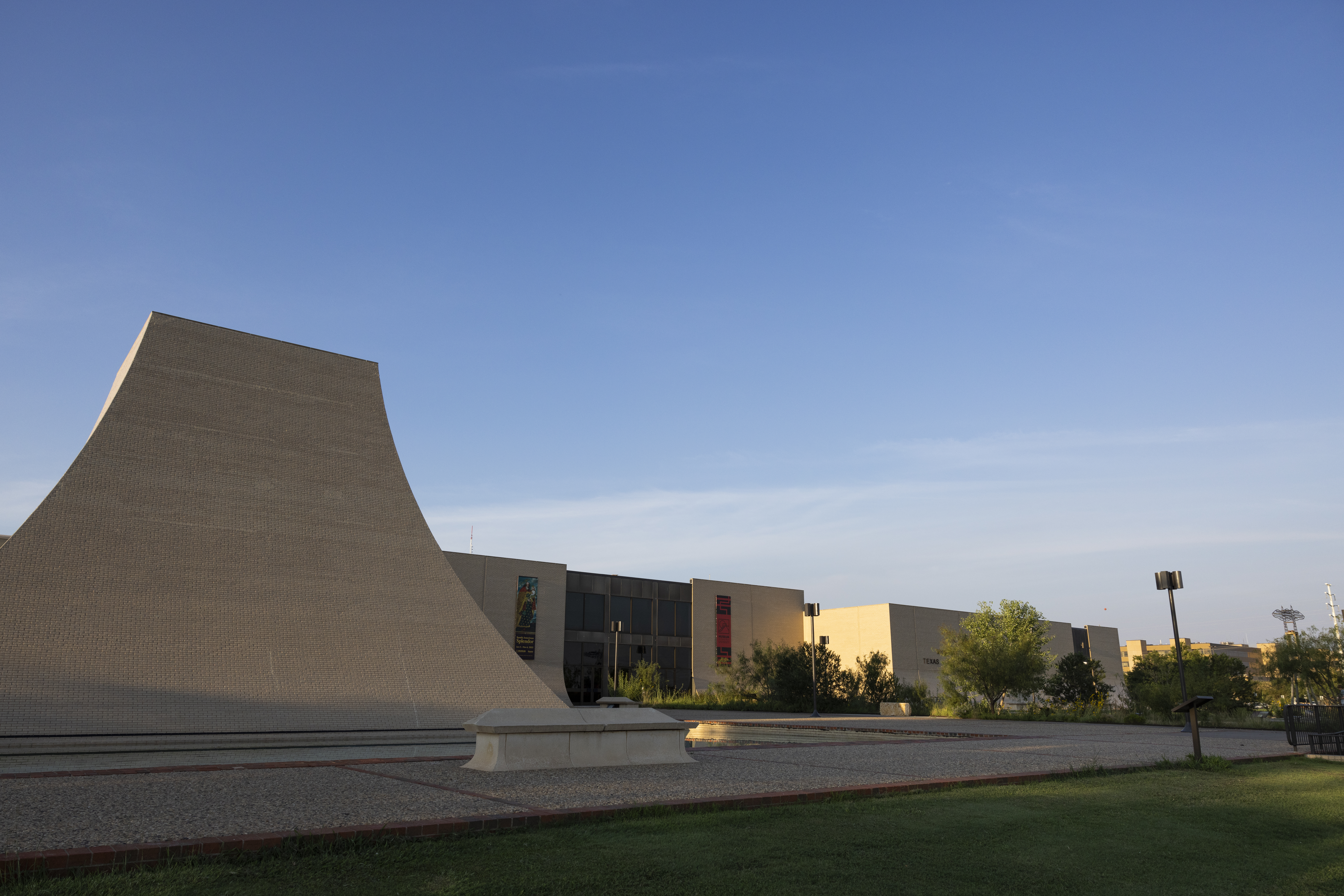
Museum at Texas Tech University with the Moody Planetarium in the foreground and the arroyo garden and main museum building extending westward.

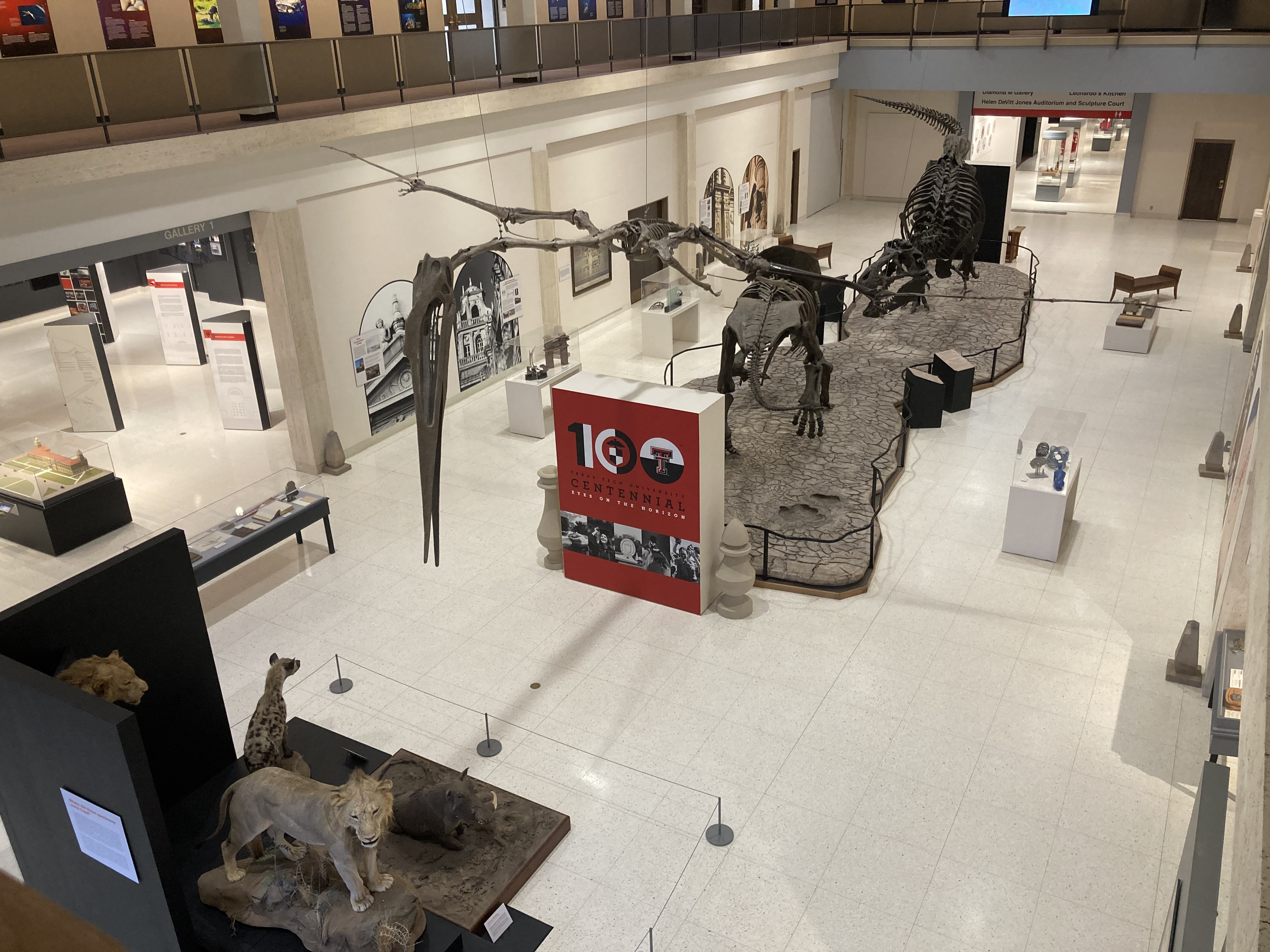
Main gallery of the Museum at Texas Tech University. Articulated cast skeletons of Quetzalcoatlus, Triceratops, and Tyrannosaurus in the central portion of the gallery.

The Museum at Texas Tech University is part of Texas Tech University in Lubbock, Texas. It is made up of the main museum building, the Moody Planetarium, the Natural Science Research Laboratory (NSRL), the research and educational elements of the Lubbock Lake Landmark, and the Val Verde County research site. It features collections in anthropology, fine arts, clothing and textiles, history, natural sciences and paleontology.

The museum's galleries include the Diamond M Galleries with American Western artists and a second gallery that focuses on the works of N.C. Wyeth; the Davies Gallery of Southwest Indian Art that displays Southwest Native American pottery and textiles; the Talkington Gallery of Art with 20th and 21st Century art of the Southwestern United States; a gallery about dinosaurs and other Mesozoic fauna; a gallery focused on the southern High Plain's prehistoric Pleistocene megafauna; and a gallery focused on biodiversity of the Llano Estacado. The museum also includes four galleries that displays temporary exhibitions throughout the year.

== History ==
The Museum at Texas Tech University was established as the West Texas Museum in 1929. It was created by the Plains Museum Society. Original plans called for a three-story building to be constructed. In the summer of 1935, 67 Texas counties agreed to pool their Texas Centennial money for a regional museum and for 35 historical markers. However, this provided only enough funds to construct a basement, which was formally dedicated on March 5, 1937. The museum called the basement home until 1950, when the entire building was finally completed thanks to $184,381 allocated to the project from the veterans' program surplus in 1948.

The museum's first director was Dr. William Curry Holden. He remained in the position until his retirement in 1969. Holden identified the first Folsom projectile points from the Lubbock Lake area at the location now known as the Lubbock Lake Landmark. For a time, the site was operated in conjunction with the Texas Parks and Wildlife Department. In 1999, it was fully transferred to Texas Tech under the supervision and care of the Museum at Texas Tech University.

In 1969, the museum was renamed "The Museum of Texas Tech." The following year, it moved into a new $2.5 million facility on a seventy-six-acre tract, and its former building, Holden Hall, was converted into classrooms and office space. Shortly after this expansion, the Natural Science Research Laboratory (NSRL) was added.

Additions to the museum since 1970 include the establishment of the National Ranching Heritage Center (1976), the construction of facilities at the Lubbock Lake Landmark (1990), the building of the Diamond M Wing to house the Diamond M Fine Art Collection (1995), the addition of the Helen Jones Auditorium and Sculpture Court Wing (2001), the building of the 18,000 square feet (1,700 m^{2}) NSRL Addition (2004), and the construction of an educational space addition to the Nash Interpretive Center at the Landmark (2007). While the physical plant was growing, the museum continued to add objects and specimens. As of 2023, its collections contain nearly 9.5 million objects and specimens.

In June 2023, the Museum at Texas Tech University expanded with the opening of the 18,000 ft^{2} Dr. Robert Neff and Louise Willson Arnold Wing. The construction expansion project consisted of three floors: a ground floor that added nearly 4,000 square feet of new gallery space to exhibit the Arnold's art collection and temporary exhibitions of regional and national art, a second floor that provided offices and laboratories for Texas Tech's Heritage and Museum Sciences Graduate Program, and a basement area to house collection storage for the Arnold’s art collection and other fine art at the Museum.

In September 2025, the institution announced a name change from the Museum of Texas Tech University to the Museum at Texas Tech University.

== Accreditation and certification ==
The Museum at Texas Tech University was first accredited by the American Alliance of Museums (AAM) in 1990. In 1998, it received continuing accreditation. AAM accreditation was renewed again in 2008 and 2020 and is effective for ten years. Only 774 of the nation's 17,000 museums are AAM accredited and, of those, only 108 are university or college facilities.

In May 2008, the Texas Historical Commission gave the museum exemplary certification through the Curatorial Facility Certification Program. The museum is the first to have no deficiencies and no disabling factors during its evaluation prior to certification.

== See also ==
- List of museums in West Texas
- Sankar Chatterjee
