= Lubbock Subpluvial =

Lubbock Subpluvial is a discredited paleoclimate theory about a wet period in early Holocene Texas and New Mexico. During this period, part of the Llano Estacado was supposedly covered with pine and spruce forest but later research has found that vegetation there scarcely changed from grasslands through the Quaternary.

== Supposed manifestations ==
The Lubbock Subpluvial was localized to the Llano Estacado region of New Mexico and Texas. According to the hypothesis, between 8,600 and 8,300 BCE, the climate was moister, the region was covered with pine and spruce forests and temperatures were colder than today. Archeologically, this period coincides with the Folsom period.

This moist period was in turn defined as a subcomponent of a longer-lasting climate anomaly, the "San Jon Pluvial". This wet climate episode in the Southern High Plains was in turn correlated to advances of the Rocky Mountain and Laurentide Ice Sheet glaciers, with individual advances connected to specific subcomponents of the "San Jon Pluvial" including the Lubbock Subpluvial. Alternatively, it was correlated with the Younger Dryas cold period.

== Research history and refutation ==
The existence of this humid period was originally postulated on the basis of lake and pollen deposits at the Lubbock Lake Site in Texas and Blackwater Draw in New Mexico, which Fred Wendorf in 1961 interpreted as indicating a past wetter period. However, even the early research noted that there was no evidence elsewhere in the American Southwest for such a large vegetation change. Later research has however indicated that the pollen data can signify the wind-driven import of pollen from remote forests and thus do not indicate that the Llano Estacado was ever covered with pine forests. In 1985, one paper noted that there was no evidence for this vegetation expansion and a 1987 publication concluded that there was no indication of significant vegetation changes on the Llano Estacado during the Quaternary. Instead, the Llano was always dominated by grasses with only sparse stands of trees.
