= Brownfield Independent School District =

School district in Texas

Brownfield Independent School District is a public school district based in Brownfield, Texas (USA).

Brownfield ISD was rated "Academically acceptable" by the Texas State Board of Education in 2011, while the high school was once again rated "Academically Unacceptable".

For the 2021–2022 school year, Brownfield High School was ranked among the bottom 15% of all high schools in Texas, placing 1,414 out of 1,861.

For the 2024-2025 school year, Brownfield High School test results show that only 27% of the student population showed proficiency in math and reading.

== Schools ==
- Brownfield High School (Grades 9-12)
- Brownfield Middle School (Grades 6-8)
- Oak Grove Elementary (Grades 2-5)
- Colonial Heights Elementary (Grades PK-1)
