= Brownfield High School =

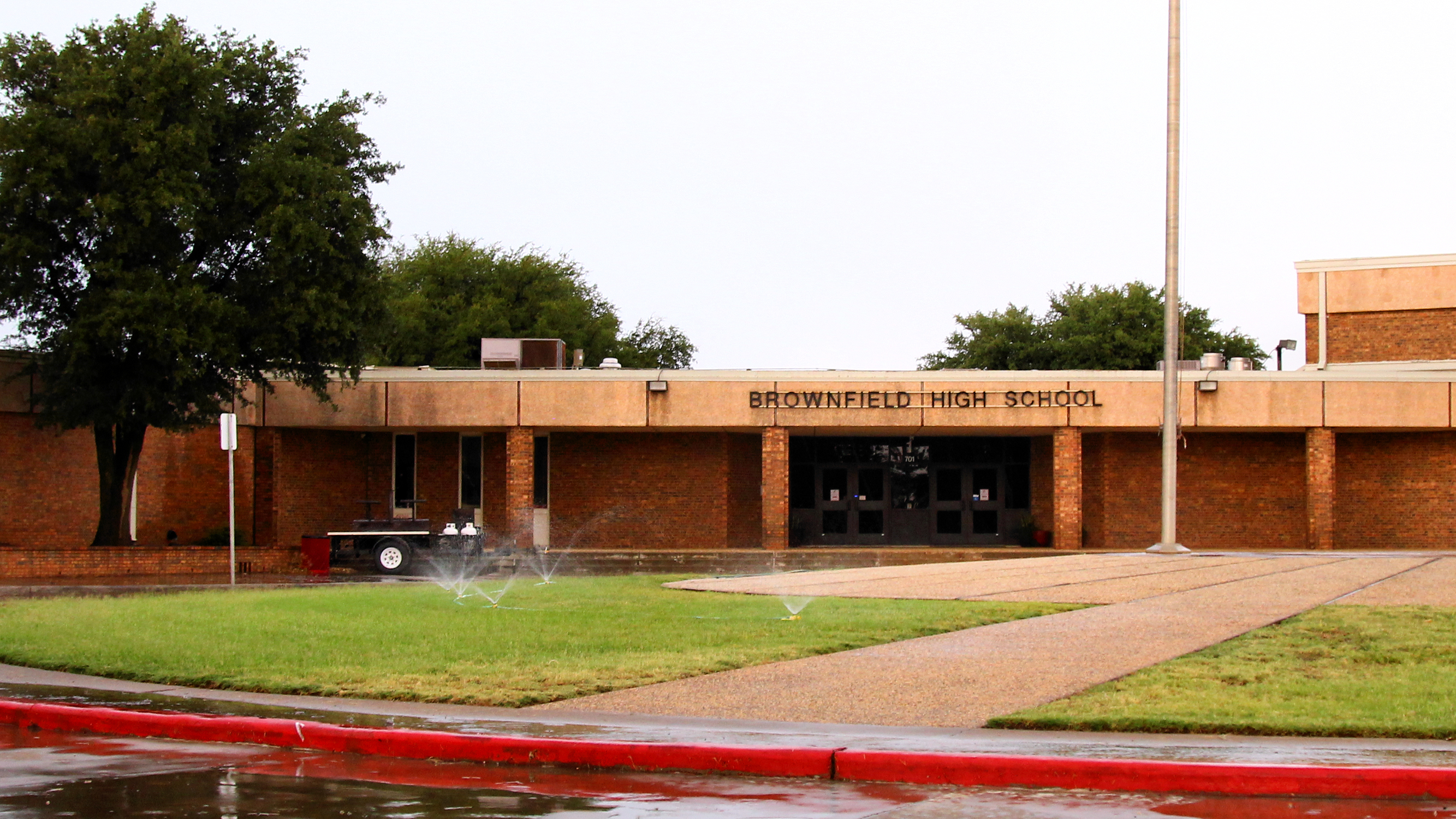

Location
- 701 N. Cub Dr. Brownfield, Texas 79316-4009; United States; 33.186°N 102.2623°W

Information
- School type: Public High School
- School district: Brownfield Independent School District
- Principal: Gionet Cooper
- Staff: 43.55 (FTE)
- Grades: 9th through 12th
- Enrollment: 467 (2023-2024)
- Student to teacher ratio: 10.72
- Colors: Red & White
- Athletics conference: UIL Class 3A
- Mascot: Cub
- Website: Brownfield High School

Brownfield High School is a public high school located in Brownfield, Texas (USA) and classified as a 3A school by the UIL. It is part of the Brownfield Independent School District located in central Terry County. In 2015, the school was rated "Met Standard" by the Texas Education Agency.

== Academics ==
The city of Brownfield is served by the Brownfield Independent School District, ranked 899 out of 932 districts in Texas with a zero star rating.

Brownfield High School was rated "Academically Unacceptable" by the Texas State Board of Education in 2011.

For the 2012–2013 school year, Brownfield High School State of Texas Assessments of Academic Readiness test scores resulted in the following student passing scores:

-23% of students passed writing

-45% of students passed algebra

-67% of students passed biology

-54% of students passed chemistry

-48% of students passed reading

-19% of students passed geography

For the 2015-16 School Year, Brownfield High School was ranked among the bottom of all high schools in Texas, with a ranking of 1384 out of 1692 high schools.

== Athletics ==
The Brownfield Cubs compete in cross country, volleyball, football, basketball, powerlifting, golf, tennis, track, baseball, and softball.

=== State titles ===
- Girls basketball
  - 2021 (3A)
  - 1988(3A)
- Girls cross country
  - 1998(3A)
- Boys basketball
  - 2016

==== State finalists ====
- Baseball
  - 1964(3A), 1986(3A)
