= Blackwater Draw Formation =

Geologic formation in New Mexico and Texas

- Stratigraphic range: Pleistocene; 1.8–0.3 Ma
- Type: Formation
- Overlies: Ogallala Formation
- Area: Over 100,000 km^{2}
- Thickness: 27 meters (89 ft)

Lithology
- Primary: Sandstone

Location
- Coordinates: 33.594°N 101.841°W
- Region: New Mexico; Texas
- Country: United States

Type section
- Named for: Blackwater Draw
- Named by: C.C. Reeves
- Year defined: 1976
- Blackwater Draw Formation (the United States) Blackwater Draw Formation (Texas)

The Blackwater Draw Formation is a geologic formation in the southern High Plains of eastern New Mexico and Texas. The formation was deposited between 1.8 million (Ma) and 300,000 years ago, corresponding to the early to middle Pleistocene epoch.

== Description ==
The formation is a very fine to fine red aeolian sandstone that rests on the resistant caprock calcrete of the Ogallala Formation. The formation is highly variable, but has a maximum thickness of 27 meters (89 ft). The sediments generally are less coarse to the northeast, indicating that they had their source in the Pecos River valley.

The formation is interpreted as loess deposition on a grassland. Deposition was likely episodic, with peak deposition at times of more arid climate and soil formation during moister periods.

The lower part of the formation contains an ash bed of the Toledo eruption in the Jemez Mountains 1.61 million years ago (Ma). The formation also contains the 0.62 Ma Lava Creek B ash bed. The upper part of the formation has an infrared stimulated luminescence (IRSL) age of 300 to 350 thousand years (ka), corresponding to the middle Pleistocene epoch.

== Fossils ==
Rhizoliths are locally abundant in paleosol beds and show features characteristic of small plants such as grasses.

== History of investigation ==
The unit was first investigated by John C. Frye and A. Byron Leonard in 1957, who named it the "Cover Sands". The unit was formally named the Blackwater Draw Formation by C.C. Reeves, Jr., in 1976.

== See also ==
- List of fossiliferous stratigraphic units in New Mexico
- Paleontology in New Mexico
