= Krista Gerlich =

American basketball player and coach

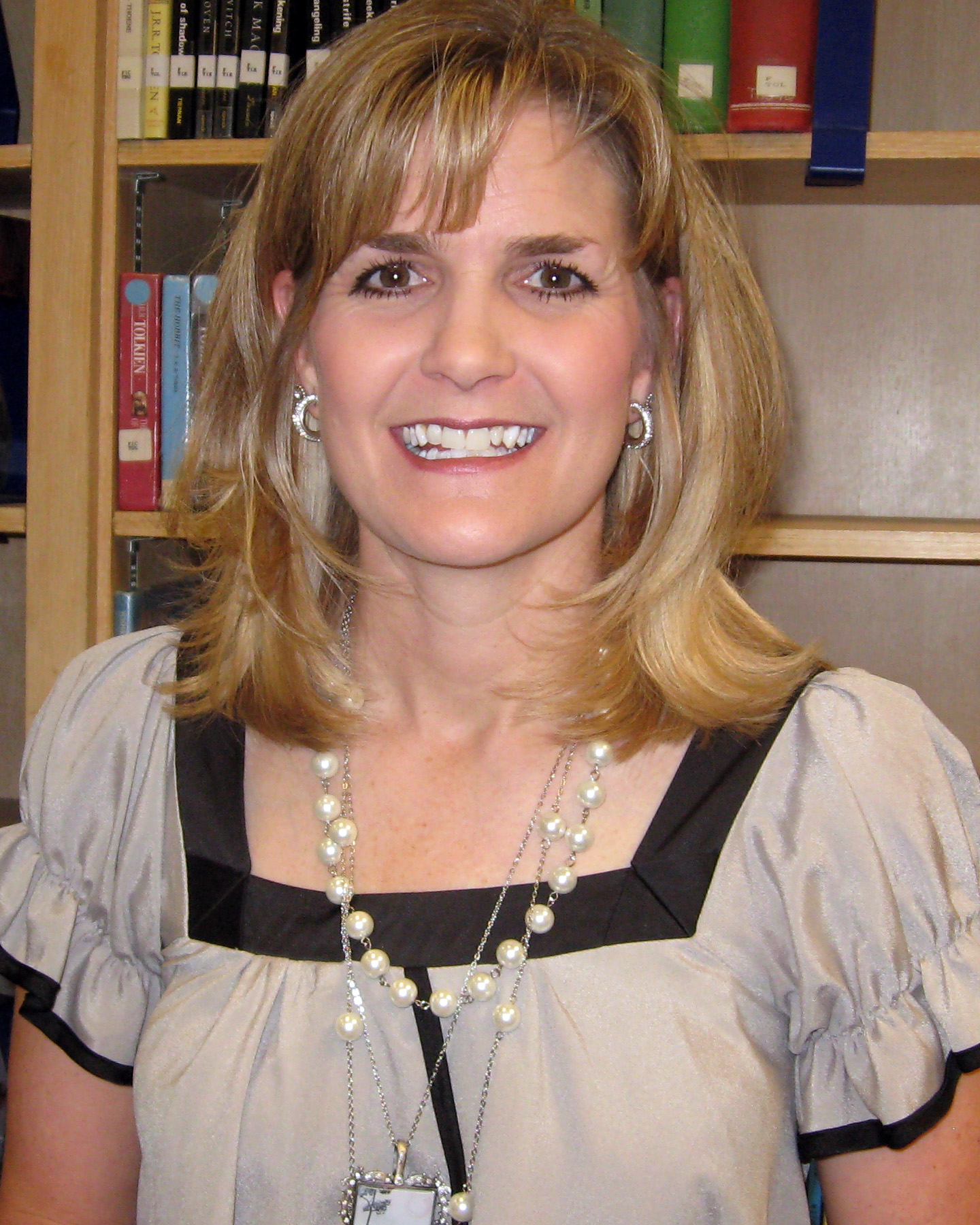
- Gerlich in 2009

Current position
- Title: Head coach
- Team: Texas Tech
- Conference: Big 12
- Record: 103–91 (.531)

Biographical details
- Born: November 16, 1970 (age 55); Spearman, Texas, U.S.
- Education: Texas Tech University (BS); Texas A&M–Kingsville (MSEdA)

Playing career
- 1989–1993: Texas Tech
- Position: Guard

Coaching career (HC unless noted)
- 1993–1994: Lockney HS
- 1994–1997: Taft HS (TX)
- 1997–1999: UTSA (Asst.)
- 1999–2000: Reagan HS
- 2003–2006: Texas Tech (Asst.)
- 2006–2013: West Texas A&M
- 2013–2020: UT Arlington
- 2020–present: Texas Tech

Head coaching record
- Overall: 392–238 (.622) (college)

Accomplishments and honors

Championships
- NCAA Division I women's basketball tournament (1993); 3× Lone Star Regular Season (2008–10); Sun Belt Regular Season (2019)

Awards
- Big 12 Coach Of The Year (2026); Sun Belt Coach of the Year (2019); 2× Lone Star Conference Coach of the Year (South Division) (2007, 2010); 2× TABC Coach of the Year (2009, 2010); Panhandle's Top 100 Athletes of the Century; All-Time SWC Team; 3× All-SWC (1991-93); SWC All-Tournament Team (1993); NCAA West Regional All-Tournament Team (1993); Final Four All-Tournament team (1993); NCAA Woman of the Year (Texas) (1993); Southwest Conference Hall of Fame (2014); Texas Tech Hall of Fame (2003); Texas Tech Lady Raiders No. 21 retired

Krista Gerlich (born November 16, 1970, in Spearman, Texas) is an American college basketball coach. She is the head coach of the Texas Tech Lady Raiders basketball team.

== West Texas A&M ==
On September 18, 2006, Gerlich was named the women's basketball coach at West Texas A&M.

She inherited a 28–4 Lone Star Champion Lady Buff program that lost in the South Central Region Tournament semifinals, including Lone Star player of the year Emily Brister.

== UT Arlington ==
Gerlich was named the head coach of the Lady Mavericks on April 11, 2013. She accumulated a program-best 121 wins with the Lady Mavs.

== Texas Tech ==
Texas Tech announced the hiring of Gerlich to lead the Lady Raiders on August 18, 2020, taking over following the scandal of the previous coach Marlene Stollings.

In Gerlich's first season in Lubbock, the Lady Raiders finished 10–15 overall and 5-13 in the Big 12. She was able to get transfer Vivian Gray who previously played for the Oklahoma State Cowgirls as well as her daughter Bryn Gerlich who also played for Oklahoma State. They were not invited to the NCAA tournament or the WNIT.

In her second season, Texas Tech went 11–19 overall and 4–14 in the Big 12. Senior guard Vivian Gray was named to the All-Big 12 First Team.

In 2022–23, Texas Tech made the WNIT and reached the Super 16 before falling 71–66 to Arkansas. This was the first postseason appearance for the Lady Raiders since the 2012–13 season.

In 2023–24, Texas Tech started off non-conference play well before dropping consecutive games to Tulsa and Oregon State. In conference play, they sat at 5–4 at one point but didn't win another game, as injuries had decimated the roster and forced Gerlich to adjust offensive and defensive philosophies. The Lady Raiders finished 17–16 overall and 5–13 in the Big 12.

In the 2024–25 season, Texas Tech again had a winning non-conference record and sat at 11–2 but immediately struggled when it came to Big 12 play, starting out 1–5. They went 4–14 in the Big 12. While they again failed to reach the NCAA tournament, they were selected for the WBIT and defeated Wyoming in the First Round and Virginia Tech in the Second Round before falling to Florida in the Quarterfinal. They finished with a 19–18 record on the season. Despite many question marks surrounding her tenure–such as having a losing record in the Big 12 and never having a winning conference record in any of her seasons–Texas Tech Athletic Director Kirby Hocutt announced that Gerlich would be retained.

The 2025–26 season would prove to be Krista Gerlich's best season at Texas Tech. The Lady Raiders started out the season 19–0 (6–0 Big 12) after an upset of then-No. 15 Baylor, and they entered the rankings for the first time in 13 years. They were one of 3 undefeated teams remaining (along with Vanderbilt and UConn) before dropping 3 of their next four games: a 65–59 loss to Kansas State at home, a 73–61 loss to BYU on the road, and an 84–70 home loss to Iowa State; they did beat Utah 77-49 in Salt Lake City during this stretch of games. After the Iowa State loss, the Lady Raiders rebounded by upsetting No. 12 TCU 62–60 at home and after victories over Houston and Kansas, they surged up to No. 16 in the polls, which was their highest ranking since 2012. Because of the success during the season, Krista Gerlich was named to the Naismith Coach of the Year Watchlist and was the only Big 12 coach selected to the list. Texas Tech eventually finished the season 25–6 overall and 12–6 in the Big 12, which was their best record in 13 years.

== Head coaching record ==
Record table
Season	Team	Overall	Conference	Standing	Postseason
West Texas A&M (Lone Star Conference) (2006–2013)
2006–07	West Texas A&M	28–5	14–0	1st	NCAA Division II second round
2007–08	West Texas A&M	26–5	14–0	1st	NCAA Division II first round
2008–09	West Texas A&M	28–6	10–2	1st	NCAA Division II Elite Eight
2009–10	West Texas A&M	30–4	10–2	1st	NCAA Division II second round
2010–11	West Texas A&M	17–11	10–4	4th	
2011–12	West Texas A&M	19–10	16–4	2nd	NCAA Division II first round
2012–2013	West Texas A&M	20–12	14–6	4th	
West Texas A&M:		168–53 (.760)	88–18 (.830)		
UT Arlington (Sun Belt Conference) (2013–2020)
2013–2014	UT Arlington	4–25	3–15	10th	
2014–2015	UT Arlington	17–13	11–9	T-4th	
2015–2016	UT Arlington	15–16	10–10	6th	
2016–2017	UT Arlington	22–9	14–4	2nd	WNIT First Round
2017–2018	UT Arlington	18–12	12–6	T-3rd	
2018–2019	UT Arlington	24–8	15–3	T-1st	WNIT Second Round
2019–2020	UT Arlington	21–11	14–4	3rd	Postseason not held
UT Arlington:		121–94 (.563)	79–51 (.608)		
Texas Tech (Big 12 Conference) (2020–present)
2020–2021	Texas Tech	10–15	5–13	T-7th	
2021–2022	Texas Tech	11–19	4–14	8th	
2022–2023	Texas Tech	20–15	6–12	8th	WNIT Super 16
2023–2024	Texas Tech	17–16	5–13	T-11th	
2024–2025	Texas Tech	19–18	4–14	T-12th	WBIT Quarterfinal
2025–2026	Texas Tech	26–8	12–6	T–4th	NCAA Division I Second Round
Texas Tech:		103–91 (.531)	36–72 (.333)		
Total:		392–238 (.622)			
National champion Postseason invitational champion Conference regular season champion Conference regular season and conference tournament champion Division regular season champion Division regular season and conference tournament champion Conference tournament champion

== Personal life ==
Krista was selected three times as an all-state player for women’s basketball during her time at Sudan High School.

She is married to former Red Raider linebacker Bryan Gerlich. They have a daughter, Bryn, and a son, Brayden.

Bryn played basketball at Texas Tech from 2020-2023 under Krista, after transferring from Oklahoma State.
