= 1993 National Invitation Tournament =

Annual NCAA college basketball competition

- Season: 1992–93
- Teams: 32
- Finals site: Madison Square Garden, New York City
- Champions: Minnesota Golden Gophers (1st title)
- Runner-up: Georgetown Hoyas (1st title game)
- Semifinalists: UAB Blazers (2nd semifinal); Providence Friars (7th semifinal)
- Winning coach: Clem Haskins (1st title)
- MVP: Voshon Lenard (Minnesota)

The 1993 National Invitation Tournament was the 1993 edition of the annual NCAA college basketball competition.

== Selected teams ==
Below is a list of the 32 teams selected for the tournament.

Team	Conference	Overall record	Appearance	Last bid
Alabama	SEC	16–12	6th	1981
Arizona State	Pac-10	18–9	4th	1992
Auburn	SEC	15–11	1st	Never
Boston College	Big East	16–12	9th	1992
Clemson	ACC	16–12	8th	1988
Connecticut	Big East	15–12	9th	1989
Florida	SEC	16–11	6th	1992
Georgetown	Big East	16–12	5th	1978
Georgia	SEC	15–13	6th	1988
Houston	Southwest	21–8	6th	1991
Jackson State	SWAC	24–8	1st	Never
James Madison	CAA	21–8	4th	1992
Miami (OH)	MAC	20–8	2nd	1970
Michigan State	Big Ten	15–12	3rd	1989
Minnesota	Big Ten	17–10	6th	1992
Niagara	MAAC	23–6	11th	1987
Ohio State	Big Ten	15–12	6th	1989
Oklahoma	Big Eight	19–11	5th	1991
Old Dominion	CAA	20–7	7th	1988
Pepperdine	West Coast	22–7	4th	1989
Providence	Big East	17–11	12th	1991
Rice	Southwest	17–9	3rd	1991
Saint Joseph's	Atlantic 10	18–10	9th	1985
Southwest Missouri State	Missouri Valley	18–10	3rd	1991
UAB	Great Midwest	17–13	5th	1992
UC Santa Barbara	Big West	18–10	3rd	1992
UNLV	Big West	21–7	3rd	1982
USC	Pac-10	16–11	2nd	1973
UTEP	WAC	20–12	5th	1981
VCU	Metro	20–9	3rd	1988
West Virginia	Atlantic 10	16–11	10th	1991
Wisconsin	Big Ten	14–13	3rd	1991

== Bracket ==
Below are the four first round brackets, along with the four-team championship bracket.

First Round
Providence	73
James Madison	61
West Virginia	95
Georgia	84
Boston College	87
Niagara	83
Rice	77
Wisconsin	73

Second Round
Providence	68
West Virginia	67
Boston College	101
Rice	68

Quarterfinals
Providence	75
Boston College	58

First Round
USC	90
UNLV	73
Pepperdine	53
UC Santa Barbara	50
Oklahoma	88
Michigan State	86
Minnesota	74
Florida	66

Second Round
USC	71
Pepperdine	59
Oklahoma	72
Minnesota	86

Quarterfinals
USC	58
Minnesota	76

First Round
Clemson	84
Auburn	72
UAB	58
Alabama	56
SW Missouri State	56
Saint Joseph's	34
Jackson State	90
Connecticut	88 OT

Second Round
Clemson	64
UAB	65
SW Missouri State	70
Jackson State	52

Quarterfinals
UAB	61
SW Missouri State	52

First Round
Georgetown	78
Arizona State	68
UTEP	67
Houston	61
Miami (OH)	56
Ohio State	53
Old Dominion	74
VCU	68

Second Round
Georgetown	71
UTEP	44
Miami (OH)	60
Old Dominion	58

Quarterfinals
Georgetown	66
Miami (OH)	53

=== Semifinals & finals ===
Semifinals
Providence	70
Minnesota	76
UAB	41
Georgetown	45

Finals
Minnesota	62
Georgetown	61

Third place game
UAB	55
Providence	52

== See also ==
- 1993 National Women's Invitational Tournament
- 1993 NCAA Division I men's basketball tournament
- 1993 NCAA Division II men's basketball tournament
- 1993 NCAA Division III men's basketball tournament
- 1993 NCAA Division I women's basketball tournament
- 1993 NCAA Division II women's basketball tournament
- 1993 NCAA Division III women's basketball tournament
- 1993 NAIA Division I men's basketball tournament
- 1993 NAIA Division II men's basketball tournament
- 1993 NAIA Division I women's basketball tournament
- 1993 NAIA Division II women's basketball tournament
