= 1993 Southwest Conference women's basketball tournament =

- Classification: Division I
- Teams: 8
- Site: Moody Coliseum; Dallas, Texas
- Champions: Texas Tech (2nd title)
- Winning coach: Marsha Sharp (2nd title)
- MVP: Sheryl Swoopes (Texas Tech)

1992–93 Southwest Conference women's basketball standings
	Conf.				Overall
Team	W		L	PCT	W		L	PCT
No. 5 Texas Tech †	13	–	1	.929	31	–	3	.912
No. 16 Texas	13	–	1	.929	22	–	8	.733
SMU	8	–	6	.571	20	–	10	.667
Texas A&M	7	–	7	.500	15	–	12	.556
Baylor	6	–	8	.429	12	–	16	.429
Houston	5	–	9	.357	11	–	16	.407
Rice	3	–	11	.214	13	–	14	.481
TCU	1	–	13	.071	10	–	17	.370
† 1993 SWC tournament winner Rankings from AP poll

The 1993 Southwest Conference women's basketball tournament was held March 10–13, 1993, at Moody Coliseum in Dallas, Texas.

Number 1 seed Texas Tech defeated 2 seed Texas 78–71 to win their 2nd championship and receive the conference's automatic bid to the 1993 NCAA tournament.

Despite the loss, Texas received an at-large bid to the NCAA tournament.

== Format and seeding ==
The tournament consisted of an 8 team single-elimination tournament.

Place	Seed	Team	Conference			Overall		
Place	Seed	Team	W	L	%	W	L	%
1	1	Texas Tech	13	1	.929	31	3	.912
1	2	Texas	13	1	.929	22	8	.733
3	3	SMU	8	6	.571	20	10	.667
4	4	Texas A&M	7	7	.500	15	12	.556
5	5	Baylor	6	8	.429	12	16	.429
6	6	Houston	5	9	.357	11	16	.407
7	7	Rice	3	11	.214	13	14	.481
8	8	TCU	1	13	.071	10	17	.370

== Tournament ==
Quarterfinal; Wednesday, March 10
1	Texas Tech	107
8	TCU	50
4	Texas A&M	61
5	Baylor	63
3	SMU	80
6	Houston	96
2	Texas	87
7	Rice	61

Semifinals; Thursday, March 11
1	Texas Tech	91
5	Baylor	67
6	Houston	76
2	Texas	95

Finals; Saturday, March 13
1	Texas Tech	78
2	Texas	71
