= 1992–93 Vanderbilt Commodores women's basketball team =

American college basketball season

1992–93 Vanderbilt Commodores women's basketball

SEC tournament champions

NCAA tournament, Final Four
- Conference: Southeastern Conference

Ranking
- Coaches: No. 3
- AP: No. 1
- Record: 30–3 (9–2 SEC)
- Head coach: Jim Foster (2nd season)
- Assistant coaches: Kamie Ethridge (2nd season); Deb Patterson (1st season)
- Home arena: Memorial Gymnasium

1992–93 SEC women's basketball standings
| | Conf. | | | | Overall |
| Team | W | | L | PCT | W | | L | PCT |
|---|---|---|---|---|---|---|---|---|
| No. 2 Tennessee | 11 | – | 0 | 1.000 | 29 | – | 3 | .906 |
| No. 7 Auburn | 9 | – | 2 | .818 | 25 | – | 4 | .862 |
| No. 1 Vanderbilt^{†} | 9 | – | 2 | .818 | 30 | – | 3 | .909 |
| Florida | 6 | – | 5 | .545 | 19 | – | 10 | .655 |
| Alabama | 6 | – | 5 | .545 | 22 | – | 9 | .710 |
| Kentucky | 5 | – | 6 | .455 | 18 | – | 10 | .643 |
| South Carolina | 5 | – | 6 | .455 | 17 | – | 10 | .630 |
| Georgia | 4 | – | 7 | .364 | 21 | – | 13 | .618 |
| Arkansas | 4 | – | 7 | .364 | 13 | – | 14 | .481 |
| Ole Miss | 4 | – | 7 | .364 | 19 | – | 10 | .655 |
| Mississippi State | 3 | – | 8 | .273 | 14 | – | 13 | .519 |
| LSU | 0 | – | 11 | .000 | 9 | – | 18 | .333 |
† 1993 SEC tournament winner Rankings from AP poll

The 1992–93 Vanderbilt Commodores women's basketball team represented Vanderbilt University during the 1992–93 college basketball season. Led by second year head coach Jim Foster, the team played their home games at Memorial Gymnasium and were members of the Southeastern Conference. The Commodores reached the NCAA Final Four for the first time in school history, and finished with a record of 30–3 (9–2 SEC) and the No. 1 ranking in the final AP poll.

To date, this is the only Vanderbilt team to reach the NCAA Final Four.

== Roster ==
1992–93 Vanderbilt Commodores women's basketball team
Players
Coaches

| Pos. | # | Name | Height | Year | Previous school | Hometown |
|---|---|---|---|---|---|---|
| C | 00 | Lesley Smith | 6 ft 0 in (1.83 m) | Jr | | Livingston, Tennessee |
| G | 11 | Rhonda Blades | 5 ft 7 in (1.7 m) | So | Parkview | Springfield, Missouri |
| F | 14 | Misty Lamb | 6 ft 2 in (1.88 m) | Sr | | Shelbyville, Tennessee |
| G | 15 | Renee Allen | 5 ft 10 in (1.78 m) | Sr | | Cincinnati, Ohio |
| F/C | 20 | Mara Cunningham | 6 ft 4 in (1.93 m) | So | | Fairfax, Virginia |
| F | 21 | Shelley Jarrard | 6 ft 1 in (1.85 m) | Sr | | Gore, Oklahoma |
| G | 22 | Ginger Jared | 5 ft 8 in (1.73 m) | Fr | | Sparta, Tennessee |
| F | 31 | Lisa King | 6 ft 1 in (1.85 m) | Sr | | San Antonio, Texas |
| G | 32 | Julie Powell | 5 ft 11 in (1.8 m) | Jr | | Woodbury, Tennessee |
| F | 33 | DeeAnn Bryan (injured) (redshirt) | 6 ft 1 in (1.85 m) | Fr | | Dellrose, Tennessee |
| C | 34 | Heidi Gillingham | 6 ft 10 in (2.08 m) | Jr | | Floresville, Texas |
| F | 44 | Kelly Dougherty (redshirt) | 6 ft 0 in (1.83 m) | Jr | | Leavenworth, Kansas |
| F | 55 | Sheri Sam | 6 ft 1 in (1.85 m) | Fr | Acadiana | Duson, Louisiana |

Head coach

- Jim Foster

Assistant coach(es)

Legend

- (C) Team captain
- (S) Suspended
- (I) Ineligible
- (W) Walk-on
- Injured
- Current redshirt

Roster

== Schedule and results ==
| Date time, TV | Rank^{#} | Opponent^{#} | Result | Record | Site (attendance) city, state |
Regular season
| Dec 1, 1992* | No. 3 | at Arizona | W 73–63 | 1–0 | McKale Center; Tucson, Arizona |
| Dec 4, 1992* | No. 3 | SW Missouri State; O’Charleys Classic | W 72–59 | 2–0 | Memorial Gymnasium; Nashville, Tennessee |
| Dec 6, 1992* | No. 3 | Oregon; O’Charleys Classic | W 72–68 | 3–0 | Memorial Gymnasium; Nashville, Tennessee |
| Dec 10, 1992* | No. 3 | Bowling Green | W 69–66 | 4–0 | Memorial Gymnasium; Nashville, Tennessee |
| Dec 13, 1992 | No. 3 | at No. 21 Alabama | W 87–70 | 5–0 (1–0) | Coleman Coliseum; Tuscaloosa, Alabama |
| Dec 15, 1992* | No. 3 | Dartmouth | W 90–52 | 6–0 | Memorial Gymnasium; Nashville, Tennessee |
| Dec 21, 1992* | No. 3 | at Texas | W 78–73 | 7–0 | Frank Erwin Center; Austin, Texas |
| Dec 29, 1992* | No. 2 | vs. No. 21 Connecticut | W 57–37 | 8–0 | Hilton Head, South Carolina |
| Dec 30, 1992* | No. 2 | vs. No. 5 Virginia | W 66–62 | 9–0 | Hilton Head, South Carolina |
| Jan 2, 1993 | No. 2 | at Georgia | W 90–66 | 10–0 (2–0) | Stegeman Coliseum; Athens, Georgia |
| Jan 5, 1993* | No. 1 | Memphis State | W 91–57 | 11–0 | Memorial Gymnasium; Nashville, Tennessee |
| Jan 7, 1993* | No. 1 | No. 13 Ohio State | W 70–67 | 12–0 | Memorial Gymnasium; Nashville, Tennessee |
| Jan 10, 1993 | No. 1 | LSU | W 87–61 | 13–0 (3–0) | Memorial Gymnasium; Nashville, Tennessee |
| Jan 14, 1993* | No. 1 | Oral Roberts | W 124–58 | 14–0 | Memorial Gymnasium; Nashville, Tennessee |
| Jan 17, 1993 | No. 1 | Mississippi State | W 108–44 | 15–0 (4–0) | Memorial Gymnasium; Nashville, Tennessee |
| Jan 19, 1993* | No. 1 | Southern Illinois | W 85–55 | 16–0 | Memorial Gymnasium; Nashville, Tennessee |
| Jan 24, 1993 | No. 1 | at Florida | W 69–63 | 17–0 (5–0) | O'Connell Center; Gainesville, Florida |
| Jan 30, 1993 | No. 1 | No. 2 Tennessee | L 68–73 | 17–1 (5–1) | Memorial Gymnasium; Nashville, Tennessee |
| Feb 4, 1993* | No. 2 | No. 18 Western Kentucky | W 62–59 | 18–1 | Memorial Gymnasium; Nashville, Tennessee |
| Feb 6, 1993 | No. 2 | at Arkansas | W 80–59 | 19–1 (6–1) | Barnhill Arena; Fayetteville, Arkansas |
| Feb 9, 1993* | No. 2 | DePaul | W 71–64 | 20–1 | Memorial Gymnasium; Nashville, Tennessee |
| Feb 13, 1993 | No. 2 | South Carolina | W 58–48 | 21–1 (7–1) | Memorial Gymnasium; Nashville, Tennessee |
| Feb 16, 1993* | No. 2 | at No. 5 Penn State | W 66–57 | 22–1 | Rec Hall; University Park, Pennsylvania |
| Feb 21, 1993 | No. 2 | at No. 6 Auburn | L 53–55 | 22–2 (7–2) | Joel H. Eaves Memorial Coliseum; Auburn, Alabama |
| Feb 23, 1993 | No. 5 | at Kentucky | W 65–52 | 23–2 (8–2) | Rupp Arena; Lexington, Kentucky |
| Feb 28, 1993 | No. 5 | Ole Miss | W 77–62 | 24–2 (9–2) | Memorial Gymnasium; Nashville, Tennessee |
SEC Tournament
| Mar 6, 1993* | (3) No. 3 | vs. (6) Kentucky; Quarterfinals | W 68–61 | 25–2 | McKenzie Arena; Chattanooga, Tennessee |
| Mar 7, 1993* | (3) No. 3 | vs. (7) Ole Miss; Semifinals | W 79–54 | 26–2 | McKenzie Arena; Chattanooga, Tennessee |
| Mar 8, 1993* | (3) No. 3 | vs. (8) Georgia; Championship game | W 76–64 | 27–2 | McKenzie Arena; Chattanooga, Tennessee |
NCAA Tournament
| Mar 20, 1993* | (1 MW) No. 1 | (9 MW) California; Second round | W 82–63 | 28–2 | Memorial Gymnasium; Nashville, Tennessee |
| Mar 25, 1993* | (1 MW) No. 1 | at (4 MW) No. 12 Stephen F. Austin; Regional Final – Elite Eight | W 58–53 | 29–2 | William R. Johnson Coliseum; Nacogdoches, Texas |
| Mar 27, 1993* | (1 MW) No. 1 | vs. (6 MW) No. 14 Louisiana Tech; Regional Final – Elite Eight | W 58–53 | 30–2 | William R. Johnson Coliseum; Nacogdoches, Texas |
| Apr 3, 1993* | (1 MW) No. 1 | vs. (2 W) No. 5 Texas Tech; National Semifinal – Final Four | L 46–60 | 30–3 | Omni Coliseum; Atlanta, Georgia |
*Non-conference game. ^{#}Rankings from AP Poll. (#) Tournament seedings in parentheses. All times are in Central.

== Rankings ==
Ranking movements Legend: ██ Increase in ranking ██ Decrease in ranking
| | Week | | | | | | | | | | | | | | | | |
| Poll | 1 | 2 | 3 | 4 | 5 | 6 | 7 | 8 | 9 | 10 | 11 | 12 | 13 | 14 | 15 | 16 | Final |
|---|---|---|---|---|---|---|---|---|---|---|---|---|---|---|---|---|---|
| AP | 3 | 3 | 3 | 3 | 2 | 1 | 1 | 1 | 1 | 2 | 2 | 2 | 5 | 3 | 1 | 1 | Not released |
| Coaches | | | | | | | | | | | | | | | | 1 | 3 |

^Coaches did not release a Week 2 poll.

== See also ==
- 1992–93 Vanderbilt Commodores men's basketball team
