= 1993 SEC women's basketball tournament =

American college basketball postseason tournament

- Classification: Division I
- Teams: 12
- Site: McKenzie Arena; Chattanooga, TN
- Champions: Vanderbilt (1st title)
- Winning coach: Jim Foster (1st title)
- MVP: Maura Cunningham (Vanderbilt)
- Attendance: 24,252

The 1993 Southeastern Conference women's basketball tournament was the postseason women's basketball tournament for the Southeastern Conference (SEC) held at the McKenzie Arena in Chattanooga, Tennessee, from March 5 – 8, 1993. The Vanderbilt Commodores won the tournament and earned an automatic bid to the 1993 NCAA Division I women's basketball tournament.

== Seeds ==
All teams in the conference participated in the tournament. Teams were seeded by their conference record.

| Seed | School | Conference record | Overall record | Tiebreaker |
|---|---|---|---|---|
| 1 | Tennessee^{‡†} | 11–0 | 29–3 | |
| 2 | Auburn^{†} | 9–2 | 25–4 | |
| 3 | Vanderbilt^{†} | 9–2 | 30–3 | |
| 4 | Florida^{†} | 6–5 | 19–10 | |
| 5 | Alabama | 6–5 | 22–9 | |
| 6 | Kentucky | 5–6 | 18–10 | |
| 7 | South Carolina | 5–6 | 17–10 | |
| 8 | Georgia | 4–7 | 21–13 | |
| 9 | Arkansas | 4–7 | 13–14 | |
| 10 | Ole Miss | 4–7 | 19–10 | |
| 11 | Mississippi State | 3–8 | 14–13 | |
| 12 | LSU | 0–11 | 9–18 | |
‡ – SEC regular season champions, and tournament No. 1 seed. † – Received a bye in the conference tournament. Overall records include all games played in the SEC Tournament.

== Schedule ==
| Game | Matchup^{#} | Score |
First Round – Fri, Mar 5
| 1 | No. 8 Georgia vs. No. 9 Arkansas | 84–73 |
| 2 | No. 5 Alabama vs. No. 12 LSU | 106–86 |
| 3 | No. 7 South Carolina vs. No. 10 Ole Miss | 57–58 |
| 4 | No. 6 Kentucky vs. No. 11 Mississippi State | 84–73 |
Quarterfinal – Sat, Mar 6
| 5 | No. 1 Tennessee vs. No. 8 Georgia | 72–73 |
| 6 | No. 4 Florida vs. No. 5 Alabama | 73–88 |
| 7 | No. 2 Auburn vs. No. 10 Ole Miss | 55–69 |
| 8 | No. 3 Vanderbilt vs. No. 6 Kentucky | 68–61 |
Semifinal – Sun, Mar 7
| 9 | No. 8 Georgia vs. No. 5 Alabama | 76–72 |
| 10 | No. 10 Ole Miss vs. No. 3 Vanderbilt | 54–79 |
Championship – Mon, Mar 8
| 11 | No. 8 Georgia vs. No. 3 Vanderbilt | 64–78 |
# – Rankings denote tournament seed

== Bracket ==
First round Fri, Mar 5
8 | Georgia | 84
9 | Arkansas | 73
5 | Alabama | 106
12 | LSU | 86
7 | South Carolina | 57
10 | Ole Miss | 58
6 | Kentucky | 84
11 | Mississippi State | 73

Quarterfinals; Sat, Mar 6
1 | Tennessee | 72
8 | Georgia | 73
4 | Florida | 73
5 | Alabama | 88
2 | Auburn | 55
10 | Ole Miss | 69
3 | Vanderbilt | 68
6 | Kentucky | 61

Semifinals; Sun, Mar 7
8 | Georgia | 76
5 | Alabama | 72
10 | Ole Miss | 54
3 | Vanderbilt | 79

Championship; Mon, Mar 8
8 | Georgia | 64
3 | Vanderbilt | 78
