= 1992–93 Texas Tech Lady Raiders basketball team =

Intercollegiate basketball season

1992–93 Texas Tech Lady Raiders basketball

SWC Regular Season Co-Champions SWC tournament champions

NCAA women's Division I tournament, Champions
- Conference: Southwest Conference

Ranking
- Coaches: No. 1
- AP: No. 5
- Record: 31–3 (13–1 SWC)
- Head coach: Marsha Sharp (11th season)
- Home arena: Lubbock Municipal Coliseum

1992–93 Southwest Conference women's basketball standings
	Conf.				Overall
Team	W		L	PCT	W		L	PCT
No. 5 Texas Tech †	13	–	1	.929	31	–	3	.912
No. 16 Texas	13	–	1	.929	22	–	8	.733
SMU	8	–	6	.571	20	–	10	.667
Texas A&M	7	–	7	.500	15	–	12	.556
Baylor	6	–	8	.429	12	–	16	.429
Houston	5	–	9	.357	11	–	16	.407
Rice	3	–	11	.214	13	–	14	.481
TCU	1	–	13	.071	10	–	17	.370
† 1993 SWC tournament winner Rankings from AP poll

The 1992–93 Texas Tech Lady Raiders basketball team represented Texas Tech University in the 1992–93 NCAA Division I women's basketball season. The Lady Raiders were led by head coach Marsha Sharp. The team won the 1993 NCAA Division I women's basketball tournament, the program's first NCAA title, and Texas Tech University's first NCAA team title.

== Roster ==
1992–93 Texas Tech Lady Raiders women's basketball team
Players	Coaches
Pos. / # / Name / Height / Year / Previous school / Hometown; G / 22 / Sheryl Swoopes / 6 ft 0 in (1.83 m) / Sr / Brownfield / Brownfield, Texas	Head coach: Marsha Sharp; Assistant coach(es) Legend: (C) Team captain; (S) Suspended; (I) Ineligible; (W) Walk-on; Injured; Current redshirt

== Schedule and results ==
Date time, TV	Rank^{#}	Opponent^{#}	Result	Record	Site (attendance) city, state
Regular season
SWC tournament
NCAA tournament
Mar 20, 1993*	(2 W) No. 5	vs. (7 W) Washington; Regional Second Round	W 70–64	27–3	Lubbock Municipal Coliseum; Lubbock, Texas
Mar 25, 1993*	(2 W) No. 5	vs. (3 W) No. 15 USC; Regional Semifinal – Sweet Sixteen	W 87–67	28–3	Harry Adams Field House; Missoula, Montana
Mar 27, 1993*	(2 W) No. 5	vs. (4 W) No. 10 Colorado; Regional Final – Elite Eight	W 79–54	29–3	Harry Adams Field House; Missoula, Montana
Apr 3, 1993*	(2 W) No. 5	vs. (1 MW) No. 1 Vanderbilt; National Semifinal – Final Four	W 60–46	30–3	Omni Coliseum; Atlanta, Georgia
Apr 5, 1993*	(2 W) No. 5	vs. (1 MW) No. 3 Ohio State; National Championship	W 84–82	31–3	Omni Coliseum; Atlanta, Georgia
*Non-conference game. ^{#}Rankings from AP Poll. (#) Tournament seedings in parentheses. W=West. All times are in Central.

=== 1993 NCAA Tournament ===
The Lady Raiders advanced through the NCAA tournament, from the West Regional in Missoula, MT. After defeating the Colorado Buffaloes in the regional finals, went on to defeat the Vanderbilt Commodores in the final four. In the national championship game, the Lady Raiders defeated the Ohio State Buckeyes, 84-82. Sheryl Swoopes, whose 47 points set a single-game championship scoring performance, was named the Most Outstanding Player.
