= 1992–93 Iowa Hawkeyes women's basketball team =

Intercollegiate basketball season

1992–93 Iowa Hawkeyes women's basketball

Big Ten co-champions

NCAA tournament, Final Four
- Conference: Big Ten Conference

Ranking
- Coaches: No. 4
- AP: No. 4
- Record: 27–4 (16–2 Big Ten)
- Head coach: C. Vivian Stringer (10th season)
- Assistant coach: Marianna Freeman
- Home arena: Carver–Hawkeye Arena

1992–93 Big Ten women's basketball standings
	Conf.				Overall
Team	W		L	PCT	W		L	PCT
No. 3 Ohio State	16	–	2	.889	28	–	4	.875
No. 4 Iowa	16	–	2	.889	27	–	4	.871
No. 8 Penn State	14	–	4	.778	22	–	6	.786
Northwestern	13	–	5	.722	20	–	9	.690
Minnesota	9	–	9	.500	14	–	12	.538
Purdue	8	–	10	.444	16	–	11	.593
Illinois	7	–	11	.389	12	–	15	.444
Michigan State	6	–	12	.333	10	–	17	.370
Indiana	5	–	13	.278	14	–	13	.519
Wisconsin	4	–	14	.222	7	–	20	.259
Michigan	1	–	17	.056	2	–	25	.074
Rankings from AP Poll

The 1992–1993 Iowa Hawkeyes women's basketball team represented the University of Iowa in the 1992–1993 NCAA women's basketball season. The Hawkeyes, led by tenth-year head coach C. Vivian Stringer, played their home games in Iowa City, IA at Carver–Hawkeye Arena as members of the Big Ten Conference. They finished the season 27–4 overall, 16–2 in Big Ten play, sharing the regular season conference championship. The team was the first Iowa Hawkeyes women's basketball team to advance to the Final Four in the women's NCAA basketball tournament.

Iowa won 23 of their first 24 games, with the only loss being a two-point defeat to No. 10 Colorado at the FIU Sun and Fun Classic tournament – a game in which the Hawkeyes missed 11 free throws. They owned a two-game lead in the conference standings with three games left on the regular season schedule, but due to back-to-back road losses at No. 8 Penn State and No. 4 Ohio State the Hawks settled for a share of the Big Ten title.

In the NCAA tournament, Iowa won against Old Dominion, No. 7 Auburn, and No. 2 Tennessee to reach the Final Four. In the national semifinal, No. 3 Ohio State, Iowa played and lost to the Buckeyes 73–72 in overtime. The team is recognised for its tournament performance during a season that included off-court challenges.

== Previous season ==
The Hawkeyes won the Big Ten championship with a 16–2 conference record, finishing two games ahead of second place Purdue. After reaching the NCAA tournament for the seventh consecutive season, No. 1 seed Iowa was stunned by No. 8 seed and eventual Final Four participant SW Missouri State, 61–60 in overtime, in the second round of the 1992 women's NCAA basketball tournament. The team finished with an overall record of 25–4 and a No. 7 ranking in the final AP poll.

== Roster ==
1992–93 Iowa Hawkeyes women's basketball team
Players
Coaches

Pos.	#	Name	Height	Year	Previous school	Hometown
G	10	Arneda Yarbrough	5 ft 5 in (1.65 m)	So	William Horlick	Racine, WI
G	11	Karen Clayton	5 ft 5 in (1.65 m)	Fr	Needham B. Broughton	Raleigh, NC
G	12	Laurie Aaron	5 ft 6 in (1.68 m)	Sr	Murray-Wright	Detroit, MI
F	15	Virgie Dilingham	5 ft 10 in (1.78 m)	Jr	Madison Central	Richmond, KY
G/F	20	Antonia Macklin	5 ft 7 in (1.7 m)	So	The English High School	Boston, MA
F	21	Nicole Tunsil	6 ft 1 in (1.85 m)	Jr	Lakewood	St. Petersburg, FL
C	31	Andrea Harmon	6 ft 2 in (1.88 m)	Jr	Midwest City	Oklahoma City, OK
F	33	Tia Jackson	6 ft 0 in (1.83 m)	Jr	Mardela	Mardela Springs, MD
C	34	Molly Tideback	6 ft 3 in (1.91 m)	Sr	Columbus; UCLA	Waterloo, IA
C	42	Cathy Marx	6 ft 5 in (1.96 m)	Jr	Riverdale	Moline, IL
F	54	Toni Foster	6 ft 1 in (1.85 m)	Sr	Marshall	Chicago, IL
C	55	Jenny Noll	6 ft 4 in (1.93 m)	Fr	Muscatine	Muscatine, IA

Head coach

- C. Vivian Stringer

Assistant coach(es)

- Marianna Freeman
- Angie Lee
- Linda Myers

Legend

- (C) Team captain
- (S) Suspended
- (I) Ineligible
- (W) Walk-on
- Injured
- Current redshirt

Roster

== Schedule and results ==
Date time, TV	Rank^{#}	Opponent^{#}	Result	Record	Site (attendance) city, state
Regular season
Dec 4, 1992*	No. 7	at Pittsburgh	W 70–59	1–0	Fitzgerald Field House; Pittsburgh, Pennsylvania
Dec 6, 1992*	No. 7	at No. 4 Maryland	W 53–50	2–0	Cole Fieldhouse; College Park, Maryland
Dec 11, 1992*	No. 5	West Virginia; Amana Hawkeye Classic	W 74–44	3–0	Carver-Hawkeye Arena; Iowa City, Iowa
Dec 12, 1992*	No. 5	UNC Charlotte; Amana Hawkeye Classic	W 60–38	4–0	Carver-Hawkeye Arena; Iowa City, Iowa
Dec 20, 1992*	No. 4	Drake	W 90–44	5–0	Carver-Hawkeye Arena; Iowa City, Iowa
Jan 2, 1993*	No. 4	vs. Bucknell; FIU Sun and Fun Classic	W 97–39	6–0	Miami, Florida
Jan 3, 1993*	No. 4	vs. No. 10 Colorado; FIU Sun and Fun Classic	L 70–72	6–1	(312); Miami, Florida
Jan 4, 1993*	No. 4	vs. Eastern Kentucky; FIU Sun and Fun Classic	W 67–63	7–1	Miami, Florida
Jan 8, 1993	No. 5	Wisconsin	W 65–39	8–1 (1–0)	Carver-Hawkeye Arena; Iowa City, Iowa
Jan 10, 1993	No. 5	at Minnesota	W 75–47	9–1 (2–0)	Williams Arena; Minneapolis, Minnesota
Jan 15, 1993	No. 7	at Illinois	W 65–57	10–1 (3–0)	Assembly Hall; Champaign, Illinois
Jan 17, 1993	No. 7	at Northwestern	W 60–55	11–1 (4–0)	Welsh–Ryan Arena; Evanston, Illinois
Jan 22, 1993	No. 6	Indiana	W 65–39	12–1 (5–0)	Carver-Hawkeye Arena; Iowa City, Iowa
Jan 26, 1993	No. 3	Northern Illinois	W 92–59	13–1	Carver-Hawkeye Arena; Iowa City, Iowa
Jan 29, 1993	No. 3	at Michigan	W 84–54	14–1 (6–0)	Crisler Arena; Ann Arbor, Michigan
Jan 31, 1993	No. 3	at Michigan State	W 75–55	15–1 (7–0)	Jenison Fieldhouse; East Lansing, Michigan
Feb 5, 1993	No. 3	No. 6 Ohio State	W 79–62	16–1 (8–0)	Carver-Hawkeye Arena; Iowa City, Iowa
Feb 7, 1993	No. 3	No. 4 Penn State	W 84–59	17–1 (9–0)	Carver-Hawkeye Arena; Iowa City, Iowa
Feb 12, 1993	No. 3	Northwestern	W 68–62	18–1 (10–0)	Carver-Hawkeye Arena; Iowa City, Iowa
Feb 14, 1993	No. 3	Illinois	W 77–58	19–1 (11–0)	Carver-Hawkeye Arena; Iowa City, Iowa
Feb 19, 1993	No. 3	at Purdue	W 63–55	20–1 (12–0)	Mackey Arena; West Lafayette, Indiana
Feb 21, 1993	No. 3	at Indiana	W 68–46	21–1 (13–0)	Assembly Hall; Bloomington, Indiana
Feb 26, 1993	No. 3	Michigan State	W 76–46	22–1 (14–0)	Carver-Hawkeye Arena; Iowa City, Iowa
Feb 28, 1993	No. 3	Michigan	W 71–34	23–1 (15–0)	Carver-Hawkeye Arena; Iowa City, Iowa
Mar 5, 1993	No. 2	at No. 8 Penn State	L 64–70	23–2 (15–1)	Rec Hall; University Park, Pennsylvania
Mar 7, 1993	No. 2	at No. 4 Ohio State	L 60–72	23–3 (15–2)	St. John Arena; Columbus, Ohio
Mar 12, 1993	No. 4	Minnesota	W 83–59	24–3 (16–2)	Carver-Hawkeye Arena; Iowa City, Iowa
NCAA tournament
Mar 21, 1993*	(2 ME) No. 4	at (7 ME) Old Dominion; Second round	W 82–56	25–3	ODU Fieldhouse; Norfolk, Virginia
Mar 25, 1993*	(2 ME) No. 4	(3 ME) No. 7 Auburn; Regional Semifinal – Sweet Sixteen	W 63–50	26–3	Carver-Hawkeye Arena; Iowa City, Iowa
Mar 27, 1993*	(2 ME) No. 4	(1 ME) No. 2 Tennessee; Regional Final – Elite Eight	W 72–56	27–3	Carver-Hawkeye Arena; Iowa City, Iowa
Apr 3, 1993*	(2 ME) No. 4	vs. (1 MW) No. 3 Ohio State; National Semifinal – Final Four	L 72–73 ^{OT}	27–4	Omni Coliseum; Atlanta, Georgia
*Non-conference game. ^{#}Rankings from AP Poll. (#) Tournament seedings in parentheses. ME=Mideast. All times are in Central.

== Rankings ==
Ranking movements Legend: ██ Increase in ranking ██ Decrease in ranking
	Week																
Poll	1	2	3	4	5	6	7	8	9	10	11	12	13	14	15	16	Final
AP	7	5	4	4	4	5	7	6	3	3	3	3	3	2	4	4	Not released
Coaches																	4

^Coaches did not release a Week 2 poll.
