= 1993 NAIA Division II men's basketball tournament =

- Teams: 20
- Finals site: Montgomery Fieldhouse; Nampa, Idaho
- Champions: Willamette Bearcats (1st title, 1st title game)
- Runner-up: Northern State Wolves (1st title game)
- Semifinalists: Northwest Nazarene Crusaders; William Jewell Cardinals
- Charles Stevenson Hustle Award: Bart Stepp (Albertson)
- Chuck Taylor MVP: Mike Ward (Willamette)
- Top scorer: Eric Kline (Northern State) (109 points)

The 1993 NAIA Division II men's basketball tournament was the tournament held by the NAIA to determine the national champion of men's college basketball among its Division II members in the United States and Canada for the 1992–93 basketball season.

Willamette defeated Northern State (SD) in the championship game, 63–56, to claim the Bearcats' first NAIA national title.

The tournament was played at the Montgomery Fieldhouse at Northwest Nazarene University in Nampa, Idaho.

== Qualification ==
The tournament field remained set at twenty teams. The top eight teams received seeds, while the eight lowest ranked teams were placed in a preliminary first round.

The tournament utilized a single-elimination format.

== Bracket ==
First round
Wilmington (DE)	83
Concordia (WI)	76
Embry–Riddle	76
Caldwell	70
Northwestern (IA)	84
Ottawa (KS)	71
Northwest Nazarene	80
St. Joseph's (ME)	74

Second round
1	Northern State (SD)	97
Wilmington (DE)	67
Albertson	79
8	Webber	68
5	Peru State	92
Tiffin	82
Embry–Riddle	82
4	William Jewell	88
3	Willamette	76
Northwestern (IA)	70
Alice Lloyd	78
6	Walsh	81
7	Tarleton State	54
Eureka	63
Northwest Nazarene	86
2	Grace	75

Quarterfinals
1	Northern State (SD)	88
Albertson	87
5	Peru State	65
4	William Jewell	66
3	Willamette	78
6	Walsh	70
Eureka	60
Northwest Nazarene	69

Semifinals
1	Northern State (SD)	87
4	William Jewell	59
3	Willamette	77
Northwest Nazarene	72

National championship
1	Northern State (SD)	56
3	Willamette	63

== See also ==
- 1993 NAIA Division I men's basketball tournament
- 1993 NCAA Division I men's basketball tournament
- 1993 NCAA Division II men's basketball tournament
- 1993 NCAA Division III men's basketball tournament
- 1993 NAIA Division II women's basketball tournament
