= 1992–93 NCAA Division I women's basketball rankings =

- Season: 1992–93
- NCAA Tournament: 1993
- Preseason No. 1: Stanford
- NCAA Tournament Champions: Texas Tech
NCAA Division I women's basketball rankings
| |

Two human polls comprise the 1992–93 NCAA Division I women's basketball rankings, the AP Poll and the Coaches Poll, in addition to various publications' preseason polls. The AP poll is currently a poll of sportswriters, while the USA Today Coaches' Poll is a poll of college coaches. The AP conducts polls weekly through the end of the regular season and conference play, while the Coaches poll conducts a final, post-NCAA tournament poll.

== Legend ==
| – | No votes |
| (#) | Ranking |

== AP Poll ==
| Team | 24-Nov | 8-Dec | 15-Dec | 22-Dec | 29-Dec | 5-Jan | 12-Jan | 19-Jan | 26-Jan | 2-Feb | 9-Feb | 16-Feb | 23-Feb | 2-Mar | 9-Mar | 16-Mar |
|---|---|---|---|---|---|---|---|---|---|---|---|---|---|---|---|---|
| Vanderbilt | 3 | 3 | 3 | 3 | 2 | 1 | 1 | 1 | 1 | 2 | 2 | 2 | 5 | 3 | 1 | 1 |
| Tennessee | 2 | 1 | 1 | 1 | 1 | 2 | 2 | 2 | 2 | 1 | 1 | 1 | 1 | 1 | 2 | 2 |
| Ohio State | – | – | – | 23 | 20 | 13 | 10 | 8 | 4 | 6 | 7 | 7 | 7 | 4 | 3 | 3 |
| Iowa | 7 | 5 | 4 | 4 | 4 | 5 | 7 | 6 | 3 | 3 | 3 | 3 | 3 | 2 | 4 | 4 |
| Texas Tech | 15 | 15 | 14 | 14 | 11 | 11 | 14 | 12 | 14 | 14 | 11 | 9 | 9 | 7 | 6 | 5 |
| Stanford | 1 | 2 | 2 | 2 | 3 | 4 | 4 | 3 | 5 | 9 | 8 | 10 | 10 | 9 | 8 | 6 |
| Auburn | 24 | 22 | 17 | 15 | 12 | 12 | 9 | 9 | 9 | 8 | 6 | 6 | 3 | 5 | 7 | 7 |
| Penn St. | 23 | 12 | 10 | 9 | 9 | 6 | 5 | 7 | 6 | 4 | 5 | 5 | 6 | 8 | 5 | 8 |
| Virginia | 6 | 6 | 5 | 5 | 5 | 9 | 8 | 10 | 1 | 1 | 14 | 11 | 11 | 10 | 10 | 9 |
| Colorado | 25 | 19 | 13 | 10 | 10 | 7 | 6 | 4 | 7 | 5 | 4 | 4 | 4 | 6 | 9 | 10 |
| Maryland | 4 | 7 | 6 | 6 | 6 | 3 | 3 | 5 | 8 | 7 | 9 | 12 | 12 | 12 | 12 | 11 |
| Stephen F. Austin | 8 | 8 | 9 | 7 | 7 | 8 | 11 | 11 | 10 | 10 | 13 | 16 | 13 | 13 | 13 | 12 |
| Western Ky. | 5 | 4 | 7 | 12 | 13 | 20 | 19 | 17 | 18 | 18 | 18 | 19 | 17 | 16 | 16 | 13 |
| Louisiana Tech | 19 | 10 | 11 | 13 | 16 | 14 | 13 | 13 | 12 | 12 | 10 | 8 | 8 | 11 | 11 | 14 |
| Southern California | 9 | 16 | 15 | 16 | 14 | 16 | 15 | 14 | 15 | 15 | 16 | 18 | 16 | 15 | 15 | 15 |
| Texas | 10 | 14 | 12 | 11 | 19 | 17 | 18 | 16 | 13 | 13 | 15 | 13 | 14 | 14 | 14 | 16 |
| North Carolina | 22 | 20 | 19 | 17 | 17 | 15 | 21 | 20 | 16 | 16 | 12 | 14 | 18 | 18 | 18 | 17 |
| Vermont | – | – | – | – | – | 25 | 20 | 19 | 17 | 17 | 17 | 15 | 15 | 17 | 17 | 18 |
| Bowling Green | – | – | – | – | – | – | – | – | – | – | – | – | 25 | 22 | 22 | 19 |
| Miami (FL) | 20 | 18 | 16 | 20 | 22 | – | – | – | – | – | – | – | – | – | 24 | 20 |
| Georgia | 18 | 13 | 20 | – | – | – | – | – | – | – | – | – | – | – | 23 | 21 |
| Nebraska | – | – | 24 | 18 | 15 | 22 | – | – | 25 | 22 | 23 | 22 | 21 | 21 | 20 | 22 |
| Hawaii | – | – | – | – | – | – | – | – | – | – | 24 | 25 | 20 | 20 | 19 | 23 |
| Kansas | 16 | – | – | – | 25 | – | – | – | – | – | – | – | – | – | – | 24 |
| Alabama | 14 | 21 | – | – | – | – | – | – | – | – | – | – | – | – | – | – |
| California | – | – | – | – | – | 24 | – | – | 22 | 23 | 25 | 23 | – | – | – | – |
| Clemson | – | – | – | – | 24 | 19 | 17 | 18 | 19 | 19 | 21 | 20 | 24 | – | – | – |
| DePaul | – | 24 | 21 | 19 | 18 | 18 | 16 | 21 | – | – | – | – | 23 | 24 | – | – |
| George Washington | 11 | 17 | 25 | – | – | – | – | – | – | – | – | – | – | – | – | – |
| Georgetown | – | – | – | – | – | – | – | – | – | – | – | – | – | 25 | – | – |
| Georgia Tech | – | – | – | 25 | 23 | 23 | 23 | 24 | – | – | – | – | – | – | – | – |
| Indiana | – | – | – | – | – | – | – | 23 | – | – | – | – | – | – | – | – |
| Kentucky | – | – | – | – | – | – | 24 | 25 | – | 25 | – | – | – | – | – | – |
| Missouri St. | 13 | 25 | – | – | – | – | – | – | – | – | – | – | – | – | – | – |
| North Carolina St. | – | – | – | 24 | – | – | – | – | – | – | – | – | – | – | – | – |
| Ole Miss | 12 | 9 | 18 | – | – | – | – | – | – | – | – | – | – | – | – | – |
| Purdue | 17 | 11 | 8 | 8 | 8 | 10 | 12 | 15 | 20 | – | – | – | – | – | – | – |
| San Diego St. | – | – | – | – | – | – | 22 | – | – | – | – | – | – | – | – | – |
| Tennessee Tech | – | – | 22 | 22 | – | – | – | – | – | – | – | – | – | – | – | – |
| UConn | 21 | 23 | 23 | 21 | 21 | 21 | – | – | – | – | – | – | – | – | – | – |
| UNLV | – | – | – | – | – | – | – | – | 23 | 20 | 19 | 17 | 19 | 19 | 21 | – |
| Northern Ill. | – | – | – | – | – | – | – | – | 24 | 24 | 22 | 21 | – | – | – | T25 |
| Oklahoma St. | – | – | – | – | – | – | 25 | 22 | 21 | 21 | 20 | 24 | 22 | 23 | 25 | T25 |

== USA Today Coaches poll ==
Source
