= Vanderbilt Commodores women's basketball =

2026–27 Vanderbilt Commodores women's basketball team
- University: Vanderbilt University
- Head coach: Shea Ralph (6th season)
- Location: Nashville, Tennessee
- Arena: Memorial Gymnasium (capacity: 14,316)
- Conference: SEC
- Nickname: Commodores
- Colors: Black and gold

NCAA Division I tournament Final Four
- 1993
Other NCAA Division I tournament results
Elite Eight	1992, 1993, 1996, 2001, 2002
Sweet Sixteen	1990, 1991, 1992, 1993, 1994, 1995, 1996, 1997, 2001, 2002, 2004, 2005, 2008, 2009, 2026
Appearances	1986, 1987, 1989, 1990, 1991, 1992, 1993, 1994, 1995, 1996, 1997, 1998, 2000, 2001, 2002, 2003, 2004, 2005, 2006, 2007, 2008, 2009, 2010, 2011, 2012, 2013, 2014, 2024, 2025, 2026

AIAW tournament appearances
- 1982

Conference tournament champions
- 1993, 1995, 2002, 2004, 2007, 2009

Uniforms
Home	Away	Alternate

The Vanderbilt Commodores women's basketball team represents Vanderbilt University in the Eastern Division of the Southeastern Conference (SEC). The team is coached by Shea Ralph.

The Commodores have never won the regular season SEC championship, although they have won six SEC tournament titles (1993, 1995, 2002, 2004, 2007 and 2009); the SEC has awarded its official championship based solely on regular-season record since the 1985–86 season.

== Memorial Gymnasium ==
The Commodores play their home games in Memorial Gymnasium. Memorial Gymnasium was built in the early 1950s. It was dedicated as the campus memorial to students and alumni killed in World War II; a plaque commemorating those who died is displayed in the gym's north lobby.

At the time of the gym's construction, there was a serious discussion within the Vanderbilt community about whether the school should de-emphasize intercollegiate athletics and refocus on its academic program. As a compromise between those who advocated increased athletics competition and those who argued in favor of de-emphasis, the gymnasium was built to hold only about 9,000 seats, and it would be readily adaptable to other uses—significantly, as a possible concert hall.

Consequently, the gymnasium floor was built up above its surroundings, more in the nature of a stage. The areas out of bounds along the sidelines were very wide, in contrast with the small facility which it replaced, where the walls were right along the sidelines and players could scrape their shoulders bringing the ball up the court. This necessitated the placement of the benches at the end of the court, which was not highly unusual at the time.

Memorial Gym is well known for its unusual design. The end-of-the-floor bench location is now unique in major college basketball, and SEC coaches who travel to Memorial, along with coaches from other schools who have played at Vanderbilt as a post-season venue, have said that the unusual setup gives Vanderbilt a tremendous home court advantage, since no other facility in which opponents play is arranged in such a way.

== Year by year results ==
Conference tournament winners noted with #. Source:

Season	Team	Overall	Conference	Standing	Postseason	Coaches' poll	AP poll
Joe Pepper (Independent, SEC) (1977–1980)
1977-78	Joe Pepper	15–9	–				
1978-79	Joe Pepper	11–16	–				
1979-80	Joe Pepper	12–14	–				
Joe Pepper:		38–39	–				
Phil Lee (Independent, SEC) (1980–1991)
1980-81	Phil Lee	12–16	–				
1981-82	Phil Lee	20–14	–		AIAW first round		
1982-83	Phil Lee	12–14	2–6	4th (SEC East)			
1983-84	Phil Lee	23–9	2–6	T-3rd (SEC East)	NWIT Champions		
1984-85	Phil Lee	14–13	2–6	5th (SEC East)			
1985-86	Phil Lee	22–9	4–5	T-6th	NCAA Second Round (Bye)	25	20
1986-87	Phil Lee	23–10	4–5	6th	NCAA Second Round (Bye)	21	18
1987-88	Phil Lee	18–10	4–5	7th			
1988-89	Phil Lee	21–8	5–4	T-4th	NCAA First Round		
1989-90	Phil Lee	23–11	5–4	5th	NCAA Sweet Sixteen	17	
1990-91	Phil Lee	19–12	4–5	T-5th	NCAA Sweet Sixteen	20	
Phil Lee:		207–126	32–46				
Jim Foster (SEC) (1991–2002)
1991-92	Jim Foster	22–9	6–5	T-4th	NCAA Elite Eight	7	13
1992-93	Jim Foster	30–3	9–2	T-2nd#	NCAA Final Four	4	1
1993-94	Jim Foster	25–8	9–2	2nd	NCAA Sweet Sixteen	13	12
1994-95	Jim Foster	28–7	8–3	T-2nd#	NCAA Sweet Sixteen	8	6
1995-96	Jim Foster	23–8	7–4	T-3rd	NCAA Elite Eight	7	12
1996-97	Jim Foster	20–11	6–6	6th	NCAA Sweet Sixteen	17	20
1997-98	Jim Foster	20–9	9–5	4th	NCAA First Round	25	18
1998-99	Jim Foster	13–14	6–8	T-8th			
1999-2000	Jim Foster	21–13	6–8	T-6th	NCAA Second Round	25	
2000-01	Jim Foster	24–10	8–6	T-6th	NCAA Elite Eight	7	10
2001-02	Jim Foster	30–7	10–4	T-2nd#	NCAA Elite Eight	5	4
Jim Foster:		256–99	84–53				
Melanie Balcomb (SEC) (2002–2016)
2002-03	Melanie Balcomb	22–10	9–5	T-5th	NCAA Second Round	20	14
2003-04	Melanie Balcomb	26–8	8–6	4th#	NCAA Sweet Sixteen	13	13
2004-05	Melanie Balcomb	24–8	10–4	3rd	NCAA Sweet Sixteen	14	18
2005-06	Melanie Balcomb	21–11	8–6	T-5th	NCAA Second Round	22	
2006-07	Melanie Balcomb	28–6	10–4	T-3rd#	NCAA Second Round	17	7
2007-08	Melanie Balcomb	25–9	11–3	3rd	NCAA Sweet Sixteen	15	21
2008-09	Melanie Balcomb	26–9	10–4	T-2nd#	NCAA Sweet Sixteen	8	14
2009-10	Melanie Balcomb	23–11	9–7	T-3rd	NCAA Second Round	24	
2010-11	Melanie Balcomb	20–12	10–6	T-3rd	NCAA First Round		
2011-12	Melanie Balcomb	23–10	9–7	7th	NCAA Second Round		
2012-13	Melanie Balcomb	21–12	9–7	7th	NCAA Second Round		
2013-14	Melanie Balcomb	18–13	7–9	8th	NCAA First Round		
2014-15	Melanie Balcomb	15–16	5–11	T-11th			
2015–16	Melanie Balcomb	18–14	5–11	11th			
Melanie Balcomb:		310–149	120–90				
Stephanie White (SEC) (2016–2021)
2016–17	Stephanie White	14–16	4–12	13th			
2017–18	Stephanie White	7–24	3–13	T-12th			
2018–19	Stephanie White	7–23	2–14	14th			
2019–20	Stephanie White	14–16	4–12	13th			
2020–21	Stephanie White	4–4	0–3	Season canceled Jan. 2021			
Stephanie White:		46–83	13–55				
Shea Ralph (SEC) (2021–present)
2021–22	Shea Ralph	16–19	4–12	13th	WNIT 3rd Round		
2022–23	Shea Ralph	12–19	3–13	12th			
2023–24	Shea Ralph	23–10	9–7	6th	NCAA First Round		
2024–25	Shea Ralph	22–11	8–8	T-8th	NCAA First Round		
2025–26	Shea Ralph	27–3	13–3	2nd		5	5
Shea Ralph:		100–62	41–43				
Total:		955–557					
National champion Postseason invitational champion Conference regular season champion Conference regular season and conference tournament champion Division regular season champion Division regular season and conference tournament champion Conference tournament champion

== Postseason results ==
=== NCAA Division I ===
Vanderbilt has reached the NCAA Division I women's basketball tournament 30 times. They have a record of 42–30.

Year	Seed	Round	Opponent	Result
1986	#5	Second Round	#4 Oklahoma	L 67–86
1987	#5	Second Round	#4 James Madison	L 60–68
1989	#7	First Round	#10 St. Joseph's	L 68–82
1990	#6	First Round; Second Round; Sweet Sixteen	#11 Rutgers #3 Iowa #2 Auburn	W 78–75; W 61–56; L 67–89
1991	#10	First Round; Second Round; Sweet Sixteen	#7 South Carolina #2 Purdue #3 Auburn	W 73–64; W 69–63; L 45–58
1992	#3	Second Round; Sweet Sixteen; Elite Eight	#6 Connecticut #2 Miami (FL) #1 Virginia	W 75–47; W 77–67; L 58–70
1993	#1	Second Round; Sweet Sixteen; Elite Eight; Final Four	#9 California #4 Stephen F. Austin #6 Louisiana Tech #2 Texas Tech	W 82–63; W 59–56; W 58–53; L 46–60
1994	#2	First Round; Second Round; Sweet Sixteen	#15 Grambling State #10 Minnesota #3 North Carolina	W 95–85; W 98–72; L 69–73
1995	#1	First Round; Second Round; Sweet Sixteen	#16 Northern Illinois #8 Memphis #4 Purdue	W 90–54; W 95–68; L 66–67
1996	#3	First Round; Second Round; Sweet Sixteen; Elite Eight	#14 Harvard #6 Wisconsin #2 Iowa #1 Connecticut	W 100–83; W 96–82; W 74–63; L 57–67
1997	#6	First Round; Second Round; Sweet Sixteen	#11 Washington #3 Kansas #2 Georgia	W 74–62; W 51–44; L 52–66
1998	#6	First Round	#11 UC Santa Barbara	L 71–76
2000	#9	First Round; Second Round	#8 Kansas #1 Louisiana Tech	W 71–69 (2OT); L 65–66
2001	#3	First Round; Second Round; Sweet Sixteen; Elite Eight	#14 Idaho State #6 Colorado #2 Iowa State #1 Notre Dame	W 83–57; W 65–59; W 84–65; L 64–72
2002	#1	First Round; Second Round; Sweet Sixteen; Elite Eight	#16 Oakland #9 Arizona State #4 North Carolina #2 Tennessee	W 63–38; W 61–35; W 70–61; L 63–68
2003	#4	First Round; Second Round	#13 Liberty #5 Boston College	W 54–44; L 85–86
2004	#2	First Round; Second Round; Sweet Sixteen	#15 Lipscomb #10 Chattanooga #6 Stanford	W 76–45; W 60–44; L 55–57
2005	#5	First Round; Second Round; Sweet Sixteen	#12 Montana #4 Kansas State #1 Michigan State	W 67–44; W 63–60; L 64–76
2006	#8	First Round; Second Round	#9 Louisville #1 North Carolina	W 76–64; L 70–89
2007	#2	First Round; Second Round	#15 Delaware State #7 Bowling Green	W 62–47; L 59–60
2008	#4	First Round; Second Round; Sweet Sixteen	#13 Montana #5 West Virginia #1 Maryland	W 75–62; W 64–46; L 66–80
2009	#4	First Round; Second Round; Sweet Sixteen	#13 Western Carolina #5 Kansas State #1 Maryland	W 73–44; W 74–61; L 74–78
2010	#6	First Round; Second Round	#11 DePaul #3 Xavier	W 83–76 (OT); L 62–63
2011	#10	First Round	#7 Louisville	L 62–81
2012	#7	First Round; Second Round	#10 Middle Tenn #2 Duke	W 60–46; L 80–96
2013	#8	First Round; Second Round	#9 St. Joseph's #1 Connecticut	W 60–54; L 44–77
2014	#8	First Round	#9 Arizona State	L 61–69
2024	#12	First Four; First Round	#12 Columbia #5 Baylor	W 72–68; L 63–80
2025	#7	First Round	#10 Oregon	L 73–77 (OT)
2026	#2	First Round; Second Round; Sweet Sixteen	#15 High Point #7 Illinois #6 Notre Dame	W 102–61; W 75–57; L 64–67

=== AIAW Division I ===
The Commodores made one appearance in the AIAW National Division I basketball tournament, with a combined record of 0–1.

Year	Round	Opponent	Result
1982	First Round	Delta State	L, 79–90

== Other awards and honors ==
- Elan Brown, 2010 All-SEC Rookie Team
- Tiffany Clarke, 2010 All-SEC Rookie Team
- Merideth Marsh, 2010 Second Team All-SEC
- Jence Ann Rhoads, 2008 All-SEC Rookie Team
- Jence Ann Rhoads, 2010, 2011 First Team All-SEC
- Jence Ann Rhoads, 2009, 2010, 2011 SEC Academic Honor Roll
- Jennifer Risper, 2008-09 Vanderbilt women's Co-Athletes of the Year
- Jennifer Risper, Women's Basketball Coaches Association (WBCA), National Defensive Player of the Year (2009)
- Jennifer Risper, SEC All-Tournament Team (2009)
- Jennifer Risper, SEC All-Defensive Team (2008)
- Jennifer Risper, Second-team All-Southeastern Conference honouree (2008)
- Jennifer Risper, all-tournament honors at the 2007 Contra Costa Times in Berkeley, California
- Jennifer Risper, all-tournament selection (2007 Vanderbilt Thanksgiving Tournament)
- Jennifer Risper, Female Newcomer of the Year honors among all Vanderbilt student-athletes (2006)
- Christina Wirth, all-tournament honors at the 2006 VU Holiday Classic
- Christina Wirth, all-tournament honors at the 2007 Contra Costa Times Classic in Berkeley, Calif
- Christina Wirth, Most Valuable Player of the 2007 Vanderbilt Thanksgiving Tournament
- Christina Wirth, named a first-team All-Southeastern Conference honoree (2008)
- Christina Wirth, Second-team recognition from the Associated Press (2008)
- Christina Wirth, named preseason All-SEC by league coaches (first team) and writers (second team) (2008)
- Christina Wirth, named to the CoSIDA Academic All-District IV third team (2008)
- Christina Wirth, All-Senior All-America First Team by the Lowe's Senior CLASS Award committee
- Christina Wirth, All-SEC Honors
- Christina Wirth, SEC Tournament Most Valuable Player
- Christina Wirth, SEC All-Tournament Team
- Christina Wirth, honorable mention on the 2009 State Farm Coaches' All-America Team
- Christina Wirth, 2008-09 Vanderbilt Women's Co-Athlete of the Year

== Player awards ==
=== SEC Awards ===
Player of the Year

- Chantelle Anderson – 2002
- Mikayla Blakes – 2026

Freshman of the Year

- Wendy Scholtens – 1988
- Donna Harris – 1990
- Mikayla Blakes – 2025
- Aubrey Galvan – 2026

== See also ==
- Vanderbilt Commodores men's basketball
