= 1992–93 Ohio State Buckeyes women's basketball team =

American college basketball season

1992–93 Ohio State Buckeyes women's basketball

Big Ten co-champions

NCAA tournament, Runner-up
- Conference: Big Ten Conference

Ranking
- Coaches: No. 2
- AP: No. 3
- Record: 28–4 (16–2 Big Ten)
- Head coach: Nancy Darsch (8th season)
- Home arena: St. John Arena

1992–93 Big Ten women's basketball standings
	Conf.				Overall
Team	W		L	PCT	W		L	PCT
No. 3 Ohio State	16	–	2	.889	28	–	4	.875
No. 4 Iowa	16	–	2	.889	27	–	4	.871
No. 8 Penn State	14	–	4	.778	22	–	6	.786
Northwestern	13	–	5	.722	20	–	9	.690
Minnesota	9	–	9	.500	14	–	12	.538
Purdue	8	–	10	.444	16	–	11	.593
Illinois	7	–	11	.389	12	–	15	.444
Michigan State	6	–	12	.333	10	–	17	.370
Indiana	5	–	13	.278	14	–	13	.519
Wisconsin	4	–	14	.222	7	–	20	.259
Michigan	1	–	17	.056	2	–	25	.074
Rankings from AP Poll

The 1992–93 Ohio State Buckeyes women's basketball team represented Ohio State University during the 1992–93 NCAA Division I women's basketball season. The Buckeyes were led by head coach Nancy Darsch in her eighth year, and played their games at St. John Arena in Columbus, Ohio as a member of the Big Ten Conference. The team shared the Big Ten title with Iowa, and reached the first Final Four in program history.

== Roster ==
1992–93 Ohio State Buckeyes women's basketball team
Players
Coaches

Pos.	#	Name	Height	Year	Previous school	Hometown
G	15	Audrey Burcy	5 ft 5 in (1.65 m)	Sr
G	22	Averrill Roberts	5 ft 9 in (1.75 m)	Sr
G/F	30	Katie Smith	5 ft 11 in (1.8 m)	Fr	Logan	Logan, OH
G	31	Adrienne Johnson	5 ft 10 in (1.78 m)	Fr	Butler Traditional	Louisville, Kentucky
F/C	43	Stacie Howard	6 ft 2 in (1.88 m)	Jr	Orrville	Orrville, Ohio
F/C	44	Lisa Negri	6 ft 2 in (1.88 m)	Fr	Powers Catholic	Flint, Michigan
F	50	Nikki Keyton	6 ft 0 in (1.83 m)	Sr

Head coach

- Nancy Darsch (Springfield)

Assistant coach(es)

Legend

- (C) Team captain
- (S) Suspended
- (I) Ineligible
- (W) Walk-on
- Injured
- Current redshirt

Roster

== Schedule and results ==
Date time, TV	Rank^{#}	Opponent^{#}	Result	Record	Site (attendance) city, state
Regular season
Dec 4, 1992*		Bowling Green	W 76–65	1–0	St. John Arena; Columbus, Ohio
Dec 13, 1992*		at Boston College	W 104–65	2–0	Conte Forum; Chestnut Hill, Massachusetts
Dec 14, 1992*		at UMass	W 81–48	3–0	Curry Hicks Cage; Amherst, Massachusetts
Dec 18, 1992*		Central Michigan; Buckeye Classic	W 97–65	4–0	St. John Arena; Columbus, Ohio
Dec 19, 1992*		Georgia; Buckeye Classic	W 89–72	5–0	St. John Arena; Columbus, Ohio
Dec 22, 1992*	No. 23	UCLA	W 91–80	6–0	St. John Arena; Columbus, Ohio
Dec 30, 1992*	No. 20	Syracuse	W 84–55	7–0	St. John Arena; Columbus, Ohio
Jan 2, 1993*	No. 20	No. 5 Virginia; Big Ten-ACC Challenge	W 91–84	8–0	St. John Arena; Columbus, Ohio
Jan 7, 1993*	No. 13	at No. 1 Vanderbilt	L 67–70	8–1	Memorial Gymnasium; Nashville, Tennessee
Jan 10, 1993	No. 13	Illinois	W 87–57	9–1 (1–0)	St. John Arena; Columbus, Ohio
Jan 15, 1993	No. 10	at No. 12 Purdue	W 84–78	10–1 (2–0)	Mackey Arena; West Lafayette, Indiana
Jan 17, 1993	No. 10	at Indiana	W 81–67	11–1 (3–0)	Assembly Hall; Bloomington, Indiana
Jan 22, 1993	No. 8	Michigan	W 90–73	12–1 (4–0)	St. John Arena; Columbus, Ohio
Jan 24, 1993	No. 8	Michigan State	W 78–57	13–1 (5–0)	St. John Arena; Columbus, Ohio
Jan 27, 1993	No. 4	at No. 6 Penn State	L 64–70	13–2 (5–1)	Rec Hall; University Park, Pennsylvania
Jan 29, 1993	No. 4	at Wisconsin	W 70–66	14–2 (6–1)	Wisconsin Field House; Madison, Wisconsin
Feb 5, 1993	No. 6	at No. 3 Iowa	L 62–79	14–3 (6–2)	Carver-Hawkeye Arena; Iowa City, Iowa
Feb 12, 1993	No. 7	Indiana	W 99–58	15–3 (7–2)	St. John Arena; Columbus, Ohio
Feb 14, 1993	No. 7	Purdue	W 72–61	16–3 (8–2)	St. John Arena; Columbus, Ohio
Feb 19, 1993	No. 7	Michigan State	W 88–51	17–3 (9–2)	Jenison Fieldhouse; East Lansing, Michigan
Feb 21, 1993	No. 7	Michigan	W 79–59	18–3 (10–2)	Crisler Arena; Ann Arbor, Michigan
Feb 24, 1993*	No. 4	No. 6 Iowa	W 73–71	19–3 (11–2)	St. John Arena; Columbus, Ohio
Feb 26, 1993*	No. 4	Wisconsin	W 95–58	20–3 (12–2)	St. John Arena; Columbus, Ohio
Mar 4, 1993*	No. 4	Minnesota	W 95–76	21–3 (13–2)	St. John Arena; Columbus, Ohio
Mar 7, 1993*	No. 4	No. 2 Iowa	W 72–60	22–3 (14–2)	St. John Arena; Columbus, Ohio
Mar 11, 1993	No. 3	Northwestern	W 76–66	23–3 (15–2)	Welsh–Ryan Arena; Evanston, Illinois
Mar 13, 1993	No. 3	Illinois	W 94–78	24–3 (16–2)	Assembly Hall; Champaign, Illinois
NCAA Women's Tournament
Mar 20, 1993*	(1 E) No. 3	(9 E) Rutgers; Second round	W 90–61	25–3	St. John Arena; Columbus, Ohio
Mar 25, 1993*	(1 E) No. 3	vs. (4 E) No. 13 Western Kentucky; Regional Semifinal – Sweet Sixteen	W 86–73	26–3	Richmond Coliseum; Richmond, Virginia
Mar 27, 1993*	(1 E) No. 3	vs. (2 E) No. 9 Virginia; Regional Final – Elite Eight	W 75–73	27–3	Richmond Coliseum; Richmond, Virginia
Apr 3, 1993*	(1 E) No. 3	vs. (2 ME) No. 4 Iowa; National Semifinal – Final Four	W 73–72 ^{OT}	28–3	Omni Coliseum; Atlanta, Georgia
April 5, 1993*	(1 E) No. 3	vs. (2 W) No. 5 Texas Tech; National Championship	L 82–84	28–4	Omni Coliseum; Atlanta, Georgia
*Non-conference game. ^{#}Rankings from AP Poll. (#) Tournament seedings in parentheses. E=East. All times are in Eastern.

== See also ==
- 1992–93 Ohio State Buckeyes men's basketball team
