= Southeastern Conference Women's Basketball Freshman of the Year =

SEC Women's Basketball Freshman of the Year
- Awarded for: the most outstanding women's basketball freshman in the Southeastern Conference
- Country: United States
- First award: 1984
- Currently held by: Aubrey Galvan, Vanderbilt

The Southeastern Conference women's basketball Freshman of the Year is a basketball award given to the women's basketball player in the Southeastern Conference (SEC) voted as the most outstanding freshman. It has been presented since the 1983–84 season. The award was first given to Katrina McClain of Georgia.

Tennessee has the most winners with eight.

== Key ==
†	Co-Freshman of the Year
*	Awarded a national Freshman of the Year award: USBWA National Freshman of the Year (USBWA) WBCA Freshman of the Year (WBCA)

== Winners ==
Season	Player	School	Position	National Freshman of the Year Awards	Reference
1983–84	Katrina McClain	Georgia	PF	—	
1984–85	Mae Ola Bolton	Auburn	F	—	
1985–86	Bridgette Gordon	Tennessee	F	—	
1985–86	Vickie Orr	Auburn	C	—	
1986–87	Kimsey O'Neal	Ole Miss		—	
1987–88	Wendy Scholtens	Vanderbilt	F	—	
1988–89	Dena Head	Tennessee	G	—	
1989–90	Donna Harris	Vanderbilt	G	—	
1990–91	Clara Jackson	Ole Miss	F	—	
1991–92	Niesa Johnson*	Alabama	G	USBWA	
1992–93	Kristen Mulligan	Auburn	G	—	
1993–94	La'Keshia Frett	Georgia	F	—	
1994–95	Christy Smith	Arkansas	G	—	
1995–96	Chamique Holdsclaw*	Tennessee	F	USBWA	
1996–97	Karyn Karlin	Arkansas	F	—	
1997–98	Tamika Catchings*	Tennessee	F	USBWA	
1998–99	DeTrina White	LSU	F	—	
1999–2000	LaToya Thomas*	Mississippi State	F	USBWA	
2000–01	Christi Thomas	Georgia	F/C	—	
2001–02	Kara Braxton	Georgia	F/C	—	
2002–03	Seimone Augustus*	LSU	G	USBWA	
2003–04	Armintie Price	Ole Miss	G	—	
2004–05	Tasha Humphrey* (Note: Co-national player of the year.)	Georgia	F	USBWA	
2005–06	Candace Parker	Tennessee	F	—	
2006–07	Ashley Houts	Georgia	G	—	
2007–08	Angie Bjorklund	Tennessee	G/F	—	
2008–09	LaSondra Barrett	LSU	F	—	
2008–09	C'eira Ricketts	Arkansas	G	—	
2009–10	A'dia Mathies	Kentucky	G	—	
2010–11	Meighan Simmons	Tennessee	G	—	
2011–12	Bria Goss	Kentucky	G	—	
2012–13	Bashaara Graves	Tennessee	F	—	
2013–14	Alaina Coates	South Carolina	C	—	
2014–15	A'ja Wilson	South Carolina	F		
2015–16	Sophie Cunningham	Missouri	G	—	
2016–17	Amber Smith †	Missouri	G	—	
2016–17	Delicia Washington †	Florida	G		
2017–18	Chennedy Carter*	Texas A&M	G	USBWA WBCA	
2018–19	Rhyne Howard*	Kentucky	G	USBWA WBCA	
2019–20	Aliyah Boston*	South Carolina	F	USBWA WBCA	
2020–21	Madison Scott	Ole Miss	F	—	
2021–22	Samara Spencer	Arkansas	G	—	
2022–23	Flau'jae Johnson	LSU	G		
2023–24	Mikaylah Williams	LSU	G	—	
2024–25	Mikayla Blakes*	Vanderbilt	G	USBWA	
2025–26	Aubrey Galvan	Vanderbilt	G	—	

== Winners by school ==
School (year joined)	Winners	Years
Tennessee (1932)	8	1986, 1989, 1996, 1998, 2006, 2008, 2011, 2013
Georgia (1932)	6	1984, 1994, 2001, 2002, 2005, 2007
LSU (1932)	4	1999, 2003, 2009, 2023
Ole Miss (1932)	4	1987, 1991, 2004, 2021
Vanderbilt (1932)	4	1988, 1990, 2025, 2026
Arkansas (1991)	3	1995, 1997, 2009
Kentucky (1932)	3	2010, 2012, 2019
South Carolina (1991)	3	2014, 2015, 2020
Auburn (1932)	2	1985, 1993
Missouri (2012)	2	2016, 2017
Mississippi State (1932)	1	2000
Alabama (1932)	1	1992
Florida (1932)	1	2017
Texas A&M (2012)	1	2018
Texas (2024)	0	—
Oklahoma (2024)	0	—
