= Aubrey Galvan =

Canadian basketball player (born 2006)

No. 3 – Vanderbilt Commodores
- Position: Guard
- League: Southeastern Conference

Personal information
- Born: October 24, 2006 (age 20)
- Listed height: 5 ft 6 in (1.68 m)

Career information
- High school: Deerfield (Deerfield, Illinois); Loyola Academy (Wilmette, Illinois)
- College: Vanderbilt (2025–present)

Career highlights
- SEC Freshman of the Year (2026); SEC All-Freshman Team (2026)

Aubrey Galvan (born October 24, 2006) is an American college basketball player for the Vanderbilt Commodores of the Southeastern Conference (SEC).

== High school career ==
Galvan attended Deerfield High School in Deerfield, Illinois for her first two years, and led them to the IBCA Class 3A state semifinals as a sophomore. She then attended Loyola Academy in Wilmette, Illinois. During her junior year, she led the Ramblers to an undefeated 38–0 campaign and the IBCA Class 4A state title.

During her senior year, she averaged 19.8 points, 3.3 steals, 3.1 assists and 2.9 steals per game. She set the Loyola Academy single-season record for most points (734) and made three-pointers (111). She also set the single-game program record with 41 points. Following the season she was named the MaxPreps Illinois Player of the Year.

She was rated a four-star recruit and the top-ranked point guard in Illinois. In August 2024, she committed to play college basketball at Vanderbilt. On November 13, 2024, she signed her National Letter of Intent (NLI).

== College career ==
On February 9, 2026, against No. 11 Oklahoma, Galvan scored a career-high 30 points. Her 30 points were the most scored by a freshman in an SEC game this season, and the second-most points scored by an SEC freshman in any game. She was subsequently named the SEC Freshman of the Week. During the final week of the regular season, she averaged 15.5 points, 7.0 assists, 5.0 rebounds and 2.0 steals and was named Co-SEC Freshman of the Week, along with Aaliyah Chavez. This was Galvan's fifth overall SEC freshman weekly honor this season, tying her with Khamil Pierre for the second-most SEC Freshman of the Week honors won by a Commodore in a single season.

During her freshman year, she averaged 12.9 points, 5.9 assists and 2.7 steals per game and held a 2.6 assist-to-turnover ratio. Galvan led all freshmen nationally in assists (178) and assists per game (5.9), while her 81 steals were the most by a Power 4 freshman and ranked fourth overall. She averaged 14.8 points, 5.1 assists and 2.4 steals per game in SEC conference play, and was named to the All-SEC freshman team and SEC Freshman of the Year.

== Career statistics ==
Legend
GP	Games played	GS	Games started	MPG	Minutes per game	RPG	Rebounds per game
APG	Assists per game	SPG	Steals per game	BPG	Blocks per game	PPG	Points per game
TO	Turnovers per game	FG%	Field-goal percentage	3P%	3-point field-goal percentage	FT%	Free-throw percentage
**Bold**	Career best	°	League leader

=== College ===
Year	Team	GP	GS	MPG	FG%	3P%	FT%	RPG	APG	SPG	BPG	TO	PPG
2025–26	Vanderbilt	34	33	34.4	42.2	33.0	78.5	3.4	5.7	2.6	0.1	2.8	13.5
**Career**		34	33	34.4	42.2	33.0	78.5	3.4	5.7	2.6	0.1	2.8	13.5
Statistics retrieved from Sports-Reference
