= 1993 NAIA Division I men's basketball tournament =

College basketball tournament

- Teams: 32
- Finals site: Kemper Arena; Kansas City, Missouri
- Champions: Hawaii Pacific (1 title, 1 title game, 1 Fab Four)
- Runner-up: Oklahoma Baptist (3 title game, 3 Fab Four)
- Semifinalists: Georgetown (KY) (7 Final Four); Midwestern State (3 Final Four)
- Charles Stevenson Hustle Award: Marcello Gomes (Oklahoma Baptist)
- Chuck Taylor MVP: Lemar Young (Hawaii Pacific)

The 1993 NAIA Men's Division I Basketball Tournament was held in March at Kemper Arena in Kansas City, Missouri. The 56th annual NAIA basketball tournament featured 32 teams playing in a single-elimination format. 1993 marked the last time NAIA Division 1 Tournament was conducted at Kemper Arena. The NAIA would move the tournament and its offices to Tulsa, Oklahoma in 1994. The tournament had been played in Kemper Arena since 1975.

== Awards and honors ==
- Leading scorers:
- Leading rebounder:
- Player of the Year: est. 1994.

== 1993 NAIA bracket ==
First round	Second round
1	Oklahoma Baptist	79
–	Tri-State	71
1	Oklahoma Baptist	84
16	Salem Teikyo	74
16	Salem Teikyo	64
–	Taylor	62*
TOP TIER
–	Ozarks (AR)	87
9	Pfeiffer	81
–	Urbana	126
–	Ozarks (AR)	104
–	Urbana	95
8	Incarnate Word	75
5	Birmingham–Southern	76
–	Drury	70
–	Georgetown (KY)	77
5	Birmingham Southern	72
–	Georgetown (KY)	92
12	Presbyterian	79
TOP TIER
13	Life	97
–	Benedict	62
13	Life	89
4	Lipscomb	94
4	Lipscomb	87'
–	McKendree	72
3	Hawaii Pacific	92
–	Kennesaw State	71
3	Hawaii Pacific	83
14	Briar Cliff	79
14	Briar Cliff	74
–	Cumberlands	70
BOTTOM TIER
–	Lenoir–Rhyne	77
11	Wisconsin–Stevens Point	74
6	Oklahoma City	67
–	Lenoir Rhyne	85
6	Oklahoma City	84
–	Spring Hill	79
–	Midwestern State	73
7	Geneva	68
–	Midwestern State	78
10	Central Washington	74
10	Central Washington	78
–	Central Arkansas	66
BOTTOM TIER
–	Belmont	87
15	Findlay	73
–	Belmont	59
–	Minnesota Morris	66
–	Minnesota–Morris	83
2	Azusa Pacific	68

Elite Eight
1	Oklahoma Baptist	83
–	Urbana	76
–	Georgetown (KY)	101
4	Lipscomb	91
–	Lenoir Rhyne	76
3	Hawaii Pacific	79
–	Midwestern State	88
–	Minnesota Morris	76

NAIA national semifinals
1	Oklahoma Baptist	83
–	Georgetown (KY)	69
3	Hawaii Pacific	84
–	Midwestern State	83

NAIA national championship
1	Oklahoma Baptist	83
3	Hawaii Pacific	88

- * denotes overtime.

== See also ==
- 1993 NAIA Division II men's basketball tournament
- 1993 NCAA Division I men's basketball tournament
- 1993 NCAA Division II men's basketball tournament
- 1993 NCAA Division III men's basketball tournament
- 1993 NAIA Division I women's basketball tournament
