= 1993 NCAA Division III women's basketball tournament =

- Teams: 32
- Finals site: , Pella, Iowa
- Champions: Central Dutch (1st title)
- Runner-up: Capital Crusaders (1st title game)
- Third place: Scranton Royals (3rd Final Four)
- Fourth place: Saint Benedict Blazers (1st Final Four)
- Winning coach: Gary Boeyink (1st title)

The 1993 NCAA Division III women's basketball tournament was the 12th annual tournament hosted by the NCAA to determine the national champion of Division III women's collegiate basketball in the United States.

Central College defeated Capital in the championship game, 71–63, to claim the Dutch's first Division III national title.

The championship rounds were hosted by Central College in Pella, Iowa.

== Bracket ==
- An asterisk by a team indicates the host of first and second round games
- An asterisk by a score indicates an overtime period

=== Northeast sectional ===
Regionals; March 5–6, 1993; Campus sites
Southern Maine*	67
Salem State	63
Northeast Regional
Western Connecticut*	68
Babson	86
(Pairings are reseeded after the first round)
Rowan*	65
William Paterson	56
Atlantic Regional
Capital*	93
Wittenberg	50

Sectional semifinals March 12, 1993; Wellesley, MA
Southern Maine	75
Rowan	48
Babson	56
Capital	68

Sectional finals March 13, 1993; Wellesley, MA
Southern Maine	56
Capital	66

=== East sectional ===
Regionals; March 5–6, 1993; Campus sites
Geneseo State*	80
Buffalo State	64
East Regional
NYU*	64*
St. John Fisher	57
(Pairings are reseeded after the first round)
Moravian*	56
Susquehanna	55
Mid-Atlantic Regional
Scranton*	103
Waynesburg	76

Sectional semifinals March 12, 1993; Geneseo, NY
Geneseo State	80
Moravian	57
NYU	54
Scranton	82

Sectional finals March 13, 1993; Geneseo, NY
Geneseo State	70
Scranton	79

=== West sectional ===
Regionals; March 5–6, 1993; Campus sites
Marysville (TN)*	85
Roanoke	67
South Regional
Marymount (VA)*	115
Christopher Newport	96
(Pairings are reseeded after the first round)
Concordia Moorhead*	78
Muskingum	64
West Regional
St. Benedict*	78
St. Thomas (MN)	65

Sectional semifinals March 12, 1993; St. Joseph, MN
Maryville (TN)	69
Concordia Moorhead	87
Marymount	75
St. Benedict	108

Sectional finals March 13, 1993; St. Joseph, MN
Concordia Moorhead	57
St. Benedict	84

=== Central sectional ===
Regionals; March 5–6, 1993; Campus sites
Wisconsin–Eau Claire*	95
Wisconsin–Stout	89
Great Lakes Regional
Calvin*	68
Wisconsin–Whitewater	76
(Pairings are reseeded after the first round)
Central (IA)*	81
Augustana (IL)	68
Central Regional
Washington St. Louis*	60
Wartburg	75

Sectional semifinals March 12, 1993; Pella, IA
Wisconsin–Eau Claire	63
Central (IA)	70
Wisconsin–Whitewater	77
Wartburg	83

Sectional finals March 13, 1993; Pella, IA
Central (IA)	62
Wartburg	60

=== Final Four ===
Final Four; March 19, 1993; Pella, IA
Capital	65
Scranton	61
St. Benedict	59
Central (IA)	60

National championship March 20, 1993; Pella, IA
Capital	63
Central (IA)	71
Third place
Scranton	89
Saint Benedict	69

== All-tournament team ==
- Sandy Buddelmeyer, Capital
- Katie Geiger, Scranton
- Emilie Hanson, Central
- Tina Kampa, Saint Benedict
- Chris Rogers, Central (IA)

== See also ==
- 1993 NCAA Division III men's basketball tournament
- 1993 NCAA Division I women's basketball tournament
- 1993 NCAA Division II women's basketball tournament
- 1993 NAIA Division I women's basketball tournament
- 1993 NAIA Division II women's basketball tournament
