= 1993 NCAA Division II women's basketball tournament =

American collegiate basketball tournament

- Teams: 32
- Finals site: , Waltham, Massachusetts
- Champions: North Dakota State Bison (2nd title)
- Runner-up: Delta State Lady Statesmen (4th title game)
- Third place: Michigan Tech Huskies (1st Final Four)
- Fourth place: Bentley Falcons (5th Final Four)
- Winning coach: Amy Ruley (2nd title)
- MOP: Nadine Schmidt (North Dakota State)

The 1993 NCAA Division II women's basketball tournament was the 12th annual tournament hosted by the NCAA to determine the national champion of Division II women's collegiate basketball in the United States.

In a rematch of the previous year's final, North Dakota State defeated defending champions Delta State in the championship game, 95–63, to claim the Bison's second NCAA Division II national title. This was North Dakota State's second title in three years and would go on to be the first of four consecutive titles for the Bison.

The championship rounds were contested in Waltham, Massachusetts.

== Regionals ==
=== New England - Waltham, Massachusetts ===
Location: Dana Center Host: Bentley College

Regional semifinals Round of 32; March 12
Bentley	71
Franklin Pierce	46
UMass Lowell	84
Stonehill	78

Regional final Sweet 16; March 13
Bentley	68
UMass Lowell	60

=== South Atlantic - Spartanburg, South Carolina ===
Location: G.B. Hodge Center Host: University of South Carolina at Spartanburg

Regional semifinals Round of 32; March 12
Fort Valley State	76
Norfolk State	90
Saint Augustine's	69
USC Spartanburg	71

Regional final Sweet 16; March 13
Norfolk State	75
USC Spartanburg	68

=== North Central - Fargo, North Dakota ===
Location: Bison Sports Arena Host: North Dakota State University

Regional semifinals Round of 32; March 12
Denver	77
North Dakota State	92
Augustana (SD)	79
North Dakota	67

Regional final Sweet 16; March 13
North Dakota State	91
Augustana (SD)	82

=== West - Pomona, California ===
Location: Kellogg Gym Host: California State Polytechnic University, Pomona

Regional semifinals Round of 32; March 12
Cal Poly Pomona	62
UC Riverside	49
UC Davis	61
Portland State	64

Regional final Sweet 16; March 13
Cal Poly Pomona	59
Portland State	51

=== East - Johnstown, Pennsylvania ===
Location: Sports Center Host: University of Pittsburgh at Johnstown

Regional semifinals Round of 32; March 13
Clarion	67
Philadelphia Textile	64
Edinboro	76
Pitt Johnstown	88*

Regional final Sweet 16; March 14
Clarion	64
Pitt Johnstown	70

=== South - Cleveland, Mississippi ===
Location: Walter Sillers Coliseum Host: Delta State University

Regional semifinals Round of 32; March 12
Florida Atlantic	74
Florida Tech	86
Delta State	90
Jacksonville State	61

Regional final Sweet 16; March 13
Florida Tech	51
Delta State	75

=== South Central - Topeka, Kansas ===
Location: Lee Arena Host: Washburn University

Regional semifinals Round of 32; March 13
Missouri Southern State	82
Pittsburg State	67
Central Missouri State	67
Washburn	77

Regional final Sweet 16; March 14
Missouri Southern State	62
Washburn	75

=== Great Lakes - Indianapolis, Indiana ===
Location: Nicoson Hall Host: University of Indianapolis

Regional semifinals Round of 32; March 12
Indianapolis	76
Saginaw Valley State	81
Bellarmine	73
Michigan Tech	92

Regional final Sweet 16; March 13
Saginaw Valley State	58
Michigan Tech	77

== National Finals - Waltham, Massachusetts ==
Final Four Location: Dana Center Host: Bentley College

National quarterfinals Elite Eight; March 20 unless indicated
Bentley	84
Norfolk State	66
Waltham, Mass. March 19 - Fargo, North Dakota
North Dakota State	91
Cal Poly Pomona	55
Pitt Johnstown	63
Delta State	96
Cleveland, Mississippi; Topeka, Kansas
Washburn	77
Michigan Tech	78*

National semifinals Final Four; March 26
Bentley	57
North Dakota State	79
Delta State	71
Michigan Tech	67

National championship March 27
North Dakota State	95
Delta State	63
Third place
Bentley	60
Michigan Tech	74

== All-tournament team ==
- Nadine Schmidt, North Dakota State
- Jody Buck, North Dakota State
- Jackie Parsley, North Dakota State
- LaTanya Patty, Delta State
- Jenny Postlewaite, Michigan Tech

== See also ==
- 1993 NCAA Division II men's basketball tournament
- 1993 NCAA Division I women's basketball tournament
- 1993 NCAA Division III women's basketball tournament
- 1993 NAIA Division I women's basketball tournament
- 1993 NAIA Division II women's basketball tournament
