= 1993 NAIA Division I women's basketball tournament =

- Teams: 32
- Finals site: Oman Arena, Jackson, Tennessee
- Champions: Arkansas Tech Golden Suns (2nd title, 2nd title game, 3rd Fab Four)
- Runner-up: Union (TN) Bulldogs (1st title game, 1st Fab Four)
- Semifinalists: Southern Nazarene Redskins (2nd Fab Four); SW Oklahoma State Bulldogs (8th Fab Four)
- Coach of the year: Joe Foley (Arkansas Tech)
- Charles Stevenson Hustle Award: Latisha Beamus (Union (TN))
- Chuck Taylor MVP: Stephanie Strack (Arkansas Tech)
- Top scorer: Sheena Bowling (Montevallo) (97 points)

The 1993 NAIA Division I women's basketball tournament was the tournament held by the NAIA to determine the national champion of women's college basketball among its Division I members in the United States and Canada for the 1992–93 basketball season.

Defending champions Arkansas Tech defeated Union (TN) in the championship game, 76–75, to claim the Golden Suns' second NAIA national title.

The tournament was played at the Oman Arena in Jackson, Tennessee.

== Qualification ==
The tournament field remained fixed at thirty-two teams, with the top sixteen teams receiving seeds.

The tournament continue to utilize a simple single-elimination format.

== Bracket ==
First round
1	Southern Nazarene	105
St. Vincent	65
Carson-Newman	49
16	Minnesota Duluth	62
9	Arkansas–Monticello	60
Oklahoma Christian	75
Catawba	57
8	Wayland Baptist	74
5	St. Edward's	71
Seattle	69
Kennesaw State	69
12	Central State (OH)	83
13	Midwestern State	71
Rockhurst	63
Fresno Pacific	60
4	Arkansas Tech	85
3	SW Oklahoma State	65
Wingate	52
Rosary (IL)	79
14	Auburn Montgomery	95
11	Campbellsville	91
Simon Fraser	76
Christ–Irvine	75
6	David Lipscomb	106
7	Montevallo	89
Claflin	76
Mobile	59
10	Hastings	69
15	William Carey	69
Oklahoma City	75
Bluefield State	53
2	Union (TN)	74

Second round
1	Southern Nazarene	72
16	Minnesota Duluth	61
Oklahoma Christian	59
8	Wayland Baptist	76
5	St. Edward's	80*
12	Central State (OH)	77
13	Midwestern State	53
4	Arkansas Tech	62
3	SW Oklahoma State	73
14	Auburn Montgomery	50
11	Campbellsville	70
6	David Lipscomb	76
7	Montevallo	93
10	Hastings	76
Oklahoma City	71
2	Union (TN)	76

Quarterfinals
1	Southern Nazarene	79
8	Wayland Baptist	77
5	St. Edward's	69
4	Arkansas Tech	75
3	SW Oklahoma State	60
6	David Lipscomb	58
7	Montevallo	70
2	Union (TN)	81

Semifinals
1	Southern Nazarene	79
4	Arkansas Tech	81
3	SW Oklahoma State	53
2	Union (TN)	54

National championship
4	Arkansas Tech	76
2	Union (TN)	75

== See also ==
- 1993 NAIA Division I men's basketball tournament
- 1993 NCAA Division I women's basketball tournament
- 1993 NCAA Division II women's basketball tournament
- 1993 NCAA Division III women's basketball tournament
- 1993 NAIA Division II women's basketball tournament
