= 1993 NAIA Division II women's basketball tournament =

- Teams: 20
- Finals site: Physical Education Building, Monmouth, Oregon
- Champions: Northern Montana Skylights (1st title, 1st title game, 1st Fab Four)
- Runner-up: Northern State Wolves (2nd title game, 2nd Fab Four)
- Semifinalists: Husson Eagles (1st Fab Four); Tarleton State TexAnns (2nd Fab Four)
- Coach of the year: Sherry Wynn (Northern Montana)
- Charles Stevenson Hustle Award: Paula Stolsmark (Northern State)
- Chuck Taylor MVP: Kristi Kincaid (Northern Montana)
- Top scorer: Julie Jensen (Northern State) (65 points)

The 1993 NAIA Division I women's basketball tournament was the tournament held by the NAIA to determine the national champion of women's college basketball among its Division II members in the United States and Canada for the 1992–93 basketball season.

This was the second NAIA tournament held exclusively for Division II teams.

Northern Montana defeated defending champions Northern State (SD) in the championship game, 71–68, to claim the Skylights' first NAIA national title.

The tournament was played at the Physical Education Building at Western Oregon State College in Monmouth, Oregon.

== Qualification ==
The tournament field was set at 20 teams. The top eight teams received seeds, with the top four receiving a bye. The lowest-ranked teams were placed in a preliminary first round.

The tournament utilized a single-elimination format.

== Bracket ==
First round
Florida Memorial	64
St. Thomas Aquinas	78
Aquinas (MI)	92
Wilmington (DE)	83
Peru State	81
St. Joseph's (ME)	64
College of the Ozarks	93
Trinity International	66

Second round
1	Northern Montana	98
St. Thomas Aquinas	65
Concordia (WI)	64
8	Georgetown (KY)	75
5	Husson	71
Sterling	55
Aquinas (MI)	47
4	Indiana Tech	68
3	Northern State (SD)	79
Peru State	54
Findlay	62
6	Western Oregon	95
7	King (TN)	47
Tarleton State	74
College of the Ozarks	81
2	Mount Mercy	102

Quarterfinals
1	Northern Montana	84
8	Georgetown (KY)	57
5	Husson	57
4	Indiana Tech	56
3	Northern State	80
6	Western Oregon	63
Tarleton State	70
2	Mount Mercy	56

Semifinals
1	Northern Montana	77
5	Husson	57
3	Northern State	66
Tarleton State	57

National championship
1	Northern Montana	71
3	Northern State	68

== See also ==
- 1993 NAIA Division II men's basketball tournament
- 1993 NCAA Division I women's basketball tournament
- 1993 NCAA Division II women's basketball tournament
- 1993 NCAA Division III women's basketball tournament
- 1993 NAIA Division I women's basketball tournament
