= Wendy Scholtens =

American judge (born 1969)

Wendy Scholtens Wood (born June 25, 1969) is a judge for the Arkansas Court of Appeals since 2023. Scholtens Wood began her law career in 1996 at Barber Law Firm. After spending ten years as an attorney, she began working at the Arkansas Court of Appeals in 2006 as a law clerk. She remained as a clerk for sixteen years before starting her judgeship.

As a basketball player at Vanderbilt University between 1987 and 1991, Wendy Scholtens set school records with 2602 points and 1272 rebounds. Her points remained in first until Chantelle Anderson became the leader in 2003. She held consecutive season records in both statistics for the Southeastern Conference from 1989 to 1991. For her basketball career, Scholtens was third with the South team at the 1989 U.S. Olympic Festival and spent a year in Japan during the early 1990s. She joined the Tennessee Sports Hall of Fame in 1999 and the Arkansas Sports Hall of Fame in 2004.

== Early life and education ==
Scholtens moved to Fort Smith, Arkansas after her birth occurred at Geneva, Illinois during June 25, 1969. She and "[her] brother ... spent a lot of time on [their] family driveway playing basketball". Scholtens was on a basketball team while attending elementary school. At Fort Smith Southside, they were first in the Arkansas Overall State Basketball Championship twice during the late 1980s. She and Arkansas Best appeared at the 18U AAU National Tournament during 1987. Scholtens appeared "in the state girl's high school All-Star game" that year.

In 1987, Vanderbilt University gave her an athletic scholarship. Scholtens was interested in joining the FBI before she started her basketball experience with the university. At the NCAA Division I women's basketball tournament, Scholtens and her team reached the regional semifinals during 1990. They also competed in the regional semifinals at the following year's event.

Scholtens was first in rebounds and points every year while at Vanderbilt. She also led in season blocks twice. After leaving the team in 1991, she had 2602 points and 1272 rebounds overall. Her points remained in first for the school until Chantelle Anderson became the new leader in 2003. Scholtens continued to lead in career rebounds for Vanderbilt during the 2020s.

In the Southeastern Conference, Scholtens held consecutive season records in points and rebounds between 1989 and 1991. With her overall statistics, she was in the top ten for the SEC with her points and rebounds in 2025. Scholtens resumed her post-secondary education when she attended the University of Arkansas at Little Rock throughout the 1990s.

== Career ==
At the 1989 U.S. Olympic Festival, she finished in third place with the South basketball team. Scholtens was with the DKB Bank of Tokyo for her basketball career in 1991. She was hired by Barber Law Firm during 1996 before her marriage that year. Wendy Wood spent ten years there as an attorney. She began her experience at the Arkansas Court of Appeals during 2006 as the law clerk for Judge Larry Vaught. Wood continued her position before being elected as Vaught's successor in 2022. Her judgeship began the following year.

== Honors and personal life ==
Scholtens was an All-American for the AAU between 1985 to 1987. Additional All-American selections during 1987 were from Parade and USA Today. That year, "she was named the Gatorade ... Arkansas High School Girls Basketball Player of the Year."

With Vanderbilt, Scholtens was All-American for the United States Basketball Writers Association and the Women's Basketball Coaches Association in 1990. She was named All-State by the Tennessee Sports Writers Association during 1991. Scholtens was Most Valuable Player in 1988 and 1989 for the university. She was a two-time Athlete of the Year there in the 1990s.

The Southeastern Conference Women's Basketball Freshman of the Year award was given to Scholtens in 1988. She received consecutive All-SEC selections between 1989 and 1991. Scholtens was a candidate for the Athlete of the Year award from the Southeastern Conference twice during this time period.

She was also a Honda Sports Award for Basketball finalist during 1990 and named Amateur Athlete of the Year by the Tennessee Sports Hall of Fame during 1991. As Wendy Scholtens Wood, she joined the Tennessee Sports Hall of Fame in 1999. Additional inductions were the Arkansas Sports Hall of Fame in 2004 and the Vanderbilt Athletics Hall of Fame during 2009. Scholtens Wood had two children during her marriage.
