= 1993 NCAA Division II men's basketball tournament =

- Teams: 32
- Finals site: Springfield Civic Center, Springfield, Massachusetts
- Champions: Bakersfield State Roadrunners (1st title)
- Runner-up: Troy State Trojans (1st title game)
- Semifinalists: Wayne State (MI) Warriors (1st Final Four); Southern New Hampshire Penmen (1st Final Four)
- Winning coach: Pat Douglass (1st title)
- MOP: Tyrone Davis (Cal State Bakersfield)
- Attendance: 44,200

The 1993 NCAA Division II men's basketball tournament involved 32 schools playing in a single-elimination tournament to determine the national champion of men's NCAA Division II college basketball as a culmination of the 1992-93 NCAA Division II men's basketball season. It was won by California State University, Bakersfield and Cal State Bakersfield's Tyrone Davis was the Most Outstanding Player.

1993 NCAA Division II Men's sites - regionals (cyan) Elite Eight (red)

== Regional participants ==
School	Outcome
Alabama A&M	Third Place
Fayetteville State	Fourth Place
North Carolina Central	Regional Champion
Virginia Union	Runner-up

School	Outcome
Alaska–Anchorage	Runner-up
Cal State Bakersfield	Regional Champion
Chico State	Fourth Place
Grand Canyon	Third Place

School	Outcome
IPFW	Fourth Place
Northern Michigan	Runner-up
Southern Indiana	Third Place
Wayne State (MI)	Regional Champion

School	Outcome
California (PA)	Third Place*
Gannon	Third Place*
Millersville	Runner-up
Philadelphia	Regional Champion

School	Outcome
Delta State	Runner-up
Florida Southern	Fourth Place
Tampa	Third Place
Troy State	Regional Champion

School	Outcome
Central Oklahoma	Third Place
Eastern New Mexico	Runner-up
Missouri Southern State	Fourth Place
Washburn	Regional Champion

School	Outcome
Bentley	Third Place
Franklin Pierce	Runner-up
Southern New Hampshire	Regional Champion
St. Anselm	Fourth Place

School	Outcome
Colorado Christian	Fourth Place
North Dakota	Runner-up
South Dakota	Regional Champion
Western State	Third Place

*denotes tie

== Regionals ==
=== South Atlantic - Fayetteville, North Carolina ===
Location: Felton J. Capel Arena Host: Fayetteville State University

Regional semifinals Round of 32; March 12
North Carolina Central	93
Alabama A&M	84
Virginia Union	67
Fayetteville State	38

Regional final Sweet 16; March 13
North Carolina Central	93
Virginia Union	81

- Third Place - Alabama A&M 79, Fayetteville State 62

=== West - Bakersfield, California ===
Location: CSUB Student Activities Center Host: California State University, Bakersfield

Regional semifinals Round of 32; March 12
Alaska-Anchorage	72
Chico State	70
Cal State Bakersfield	98
Grand Canyon	68

Regional final Sweet 16; March 13
Alaska-Anchorage	59
Cal State Bakersfield	78

- Third Place - Grand Canyon 103, Chico State 98

=== Great Lakes - Evansville, Indiana ===
Location: Physical Activities Center Host: University of Southern Indiana

Regional semifinals Round of 32; March 12
Northern Michigan	86
Southern Indiana	85
Wayne State (MI)	78
IPFW	72

Regional final Sweet 16; March 13
Northern Michigan	58
Wayne State (MI)	90

- Third Place - Southern Indiana 95, IPFW 93

=== East - Millersville, Pennsylvania ===
Location: Pucillo Gymnasium Host: Millersville University of Pennsylvania

Regional semifinals Round of 32; March 12
Millersville	86
California (PA)	77
Philadelphia U	70
Gannon	56

Regional final Sweet 16; March 13
Millersville	62
Philadelphia U	70

=== South - Troy, Alabama ===
Location: Sartain Hall Host: Troy State University

Regional semifinals Round of 32; March 12
Delta State	73
Tampa	61
Troy	75
Florida Southern	72

Regional final Sweet 16; March 13
Delta State	93
Troy	110

- Third Place - Tampa 79, Florida Southern 73

=== South Central - Edmond, Oklahoma ===
Location: Hamilton Fieldhouse Host: University of Central Oklahoma

Regional semifinals Round of 32; March 12
Washburn	92
Central Oklahoma	88
Eastern New Mexico	76
Missouri Southern State	73

Regional final Sweet 16; March 13
Washburn	79
Eastern New Mexico	78

- Third Place - Central Oklahoma 116, Missouri Southern State 109

=== New England - Manchester, New Hampshire ===
Location: NHC Fieldhouse Host: New Hampshire College

Regional semifinals Round of 32; March 12
Franklin Pierce	95
Bentley	74
Southern New Hampshire	67
St. Anselm	63

Regional final Sweet 16; March 13
Franklin Pierce	73
Southern New Hampshire	83

- Third Place - Bentley 109, St. Anselm 90

=== North Central - Grand Forks, North Dakota ===
Location: Hyslop Sports Center Host: University of North Dakota

Regional semifinals Round of 32; March 12
North Dakota	80
Western State	61
South Dakota	78
Colorado Christian	60

Regional final Sweet 16; March 13
North Dakota	64
South Dakota	66*

- Third Place - Western State 81, Colorado Christian 71

*denotes each overtime played

== Elite Eight - Springfield, Massachusetts ==
Location: Springfield Civic Center Hosts: American International College and Springfield College

National Quarterfinals; Elite Eight; March 25
North Carolina Central	80
Cal State Bakersfield	86
Wayne State (MI)	78
Philadelphia U	76
Troy	94
Washburn	82
Southern New Hampshire	100**
South Dakota	96

National semifinals Final Four; March 26
Cal State Bakersfield	61
Wayne State (MI)	57
Troy	126
Southern New Hampshire	123

National championship March 27
Cal State Bakersfield	85
Troy	72

*denotes each overtime played

== All-tournament team ==
- Tyrone Davis (Cal State-Bakersfield)
- Danny Lewis (Wayne State (MI))
- Terry McCord (Troy State)
- Roheen Oats (Cal State-Bakersfield)
- Wayne Robertson (New Hampshire College)

== See also ==
- 1993 NCAA Division II women's basketball tournament
- 1993 NCAA Division I men's basketball tournament
- 1993 NCAA Division III men's basketball tournament
- 1993 NAIA Division I men's basketball tournament
- 1993 NAIA Division II men's basketball tournament
