= Marsha Sharp =

American basketball coach (born 1952)

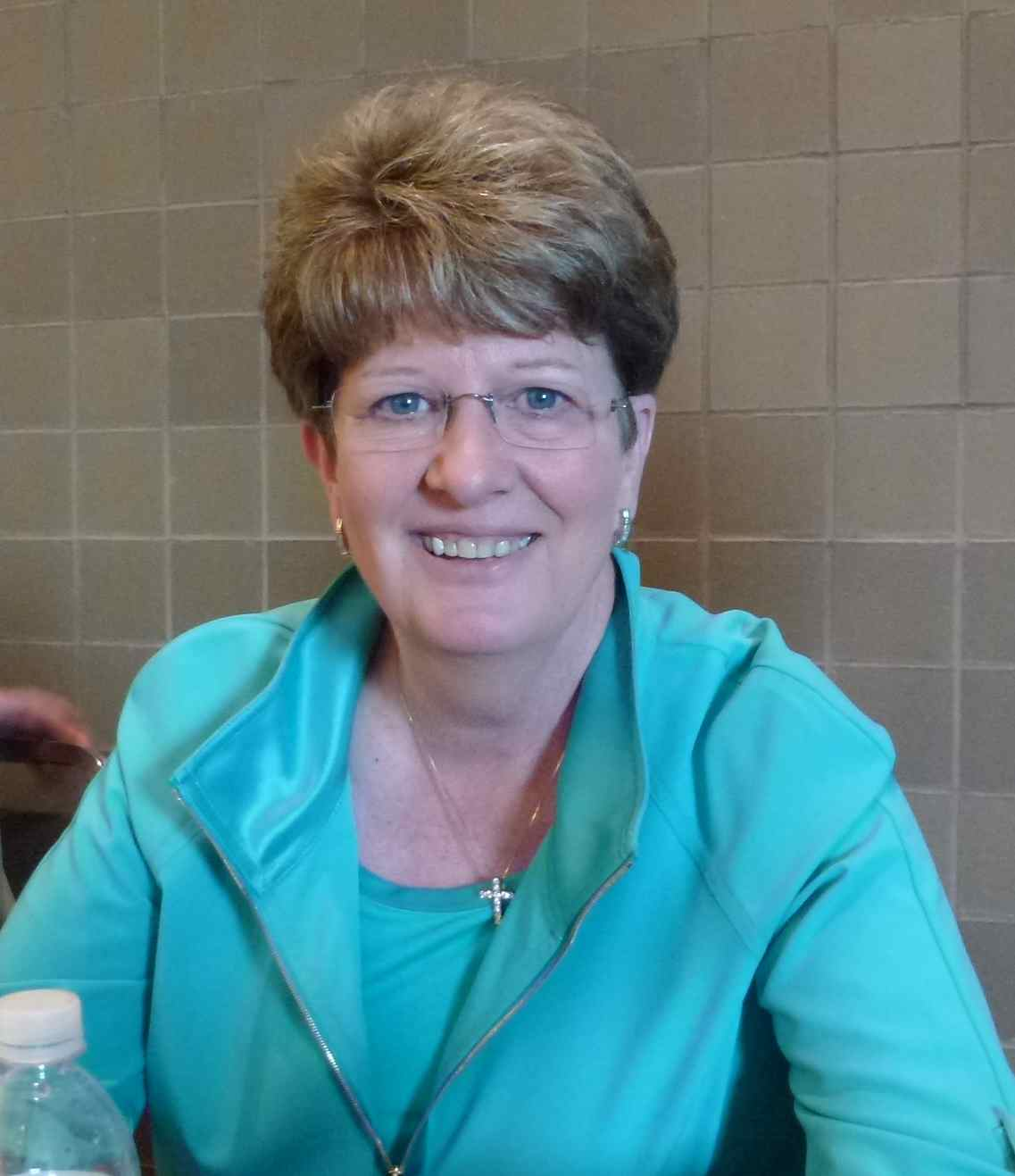
- Sharp at the 2013 Women's Basketball Coaches Association convention in New Orleans

Biographical details
- Born: August 31, 1952 (age 74); Whidbey Island, Washington, U.S.
- Education: Wayland Baptist College; West Texas State University

Coaching career (HC unless noted)
- 1981–1982: Texas Tech (asst.)
- 1982–2006: Texas Tech

Administrative career (AD unless noted)
- 2011–present: Texas Tech (asst. AD)

Head coaching record
- Overall: 572–189 (.752)

Accomplishments and honors

Championships
- NCAA Division I women's basketball tournament (1993); 3 SWC women's basketball tournament (1992, 1993, 1995); 2 Big 12 women's basketball tournament (1998, 1999); 5 SWC Regular Season (1992–1996); 3 Big 12 Regular Season (1998, 1999, 2000)

Awards
- 2× Big 12 Coach of the Year (1998, 1999); 6× SWC Coach of the Year (1983, 1991–1995); Russell Athletic/WBCA National Coach of the Year (1995)
- Women's Basketball Hall of Fame

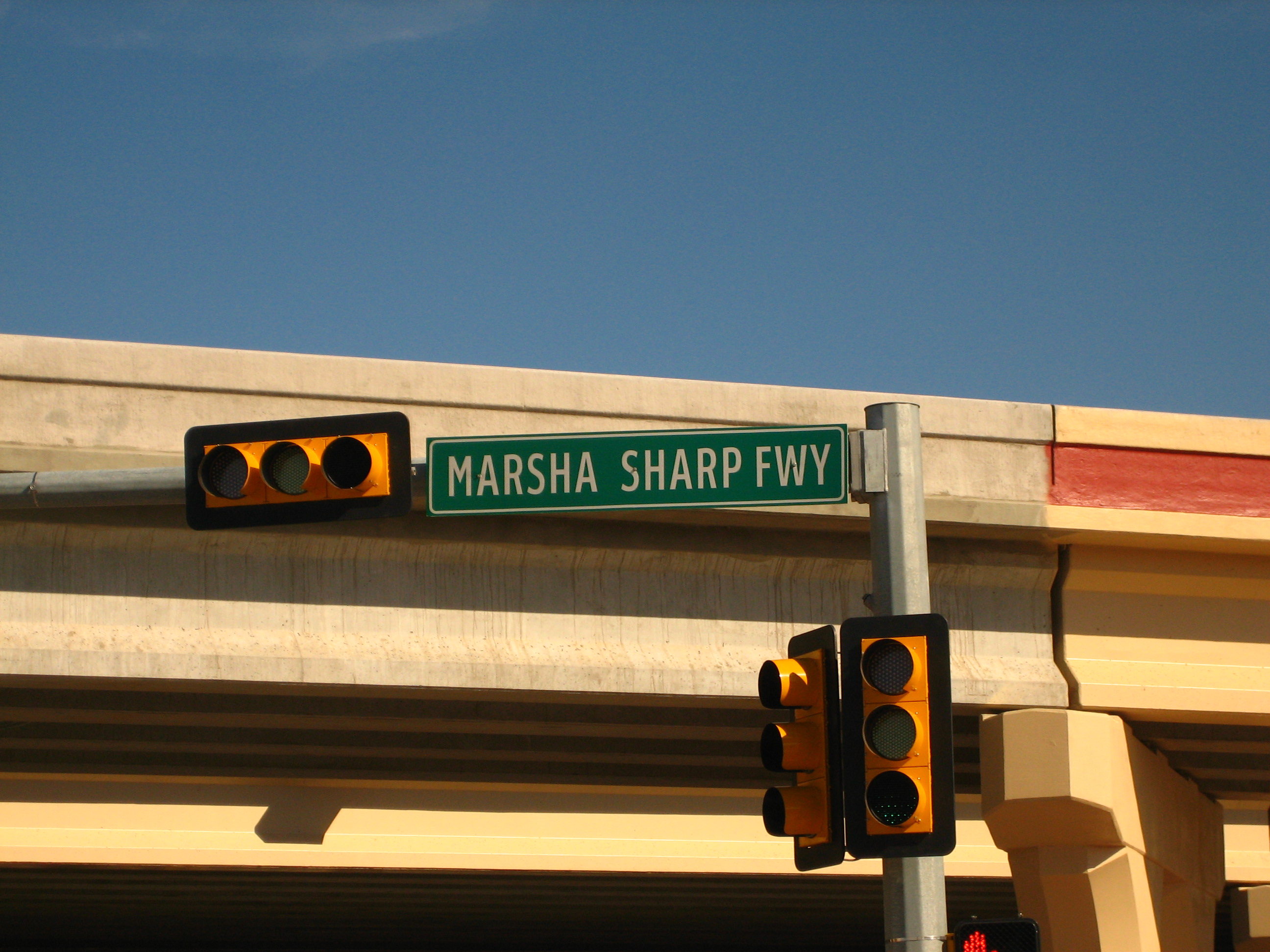
The Marsha Sharp Freeway on U.S. Highway 82 in Lubbock

Marsha Sharp (born August 31, 1952) is the former head coach of Texas Tech University's women's basketball team, the Lady Raiders. She retired after 24 years at the conclusion of the 2005–06 season. Sharp was inducted into the Women's Basketball Hall of Fame in 2003.

== Early life ==
Sharp went to high school in Tulia, Texas. She graduated in 1974 from Wayland Baptist University in Plainview. She procured her master's degree in 1976 from West Texas State University (now West Texas A&M University) in Canyon.

== Coaching career ==
She became the head coach of the Lady Raiders in 1982. For most of the 1980s, Sharp's Lady Raiders were the second-best team in the Southwest Conference, behind the Texas Longhorns under Jody Conradt. However, they dominated the last years of the SWC's existence, winning the last five regular season titles in a row (four outright, one shared) and three conference tournaments. Her best team was the 1992–93 unit, led by Sheryl Swoopes, which won the first NCAA championship by a Texas Tech team in any sport. After Texas Tech became a charter member of the Big 12 Conference in 1996, Sharp added three more regular season titles and two tournament titles.

Sharp's 24-year career won–lost records included a 258–89 record (.744 winning percentage) in conference play (Southwest Conference and Big 12 Conference combined) and a 572–189 record (.752 winning percentage) overall with no losing seasons.

In 2003, Sharp was inducted into the Women's Basketball Hall of Fame. The Marsha Sharp Center for Student-Athletes on the campus of Texas Tech and the Marsha Sharp Freeway in Lubbock are both named after Sharp.

Following Sharp's retirement from coaching, she was named Associate Athletic Director for Special Projects within the Texas Tech Athletic Department.

== Head coaching record ==
Record table
Season	Team	Overall	Conference	Standing	Postseason
Texas Tech Lady Raiders (Southwest Conference) (1982/83–1995/96)
1982–83	Texas Tech	22–9	6–2	2nd	NWIT Fifth Place
1983–84	Texas Tech	23–7	13–3	2nd	NCAA first round
1984–85	Texas Tech	24–8	12–4	2nd	NWIT Third Place
1985–86	Texas Tech	21–9	13–3	2nd	NCAA second round
1986–87	Texas Tech	18–11	10–6	3rd	
1987–88	Texas Tech	17–13	9–7	3rd	
1988–89	Texas Tech	15–13	9–7	3rd	
1989–90	Texas Tech	20–11	11–5	3rd	NCAA first round
1990–91	Texas Tech	23–8	12–4	3rd	NCAA first round
1991–92	Texas Tech	27–5	13–1	1st	NCAA Sweet Sixteen
1992–93	Texas Tech	31–3	13–1	1st	NCAA Champions
1993–94	Texas Tech	28–5	12–2	1st	NCAA Sweet Sixteen
1994–95	Texas Tech	33–4	13–1	1st	NCAA Elite Eight
1995–96	Texas Tech	27–5	13–1	T–1st	NCAA Sweet Sixteen
Texas Tech Lady Raiders (Big 12 Conference) (1996/97–2005/06)
1996–97	Texas Tech	20–9	11–5	4th	NCAA second round
1997–98	Texas Tech	26–5	15–1	1st	NCAA second round
1998–99	Texas Tech	30–4	14–2	1st	NCAA Sweet Sixteen
1999–00	Texas Tech	28–5	13–3	T–1st	NCAA Elite Eight
2000–01	Texas Tech	25–7	13–3	2nd	NCAA Sweet Sixteen
2001–02	Texas Tech	20–12	8–8	7th	NCAA Sweet Sixteen
2002–03	Texas Tech	29–6	13–3	3rd	NCAA Elite Eight
2003–04	Texas Tech	25–8	10–6	T–4th	NCAA second round
2004–05	Texas Tech	24–8	12–4	T–3rd	NCAA Sweet Sixteen
2005–06	Texas Tech	15–14	9–7	5th	
Texas Tech:		571–189	257–89		
Total:		571–189 (.751)			
National champion Postseason invitational champion Conference regular season champion Conference regular season and conference tournament champion Division regular season champion Division regular season and conference tournament champion Conference tournament champion

== Awards and honors ==
- 1994—Russell Athletic/WBCA National Coach of the Year
- 2003—Carol Eckman Award

== See also ==
- U.S. Route 82 in Texas
