= 1993 NCAA Division III men's basketball tournament =

American collegiate men's basketball tournament (1993)

- Teams: 40
- Finals site: , Buffalo, New York
- Champions: Ohio Northern (1st title)
- Runner-up: Augustana (IL) (2nd title game)
- Semifinalists: Rowan (2nd Final Four); UMass Dartmouth (1st Final Four)
- Winning coach: Joe Campoli (Ohio Northern)
- MOP: Kirk Anderson (Augustana)
- Attendance: 32,360

The 1993 NCAA Division III men's basketball tournament was the 19th annual single-elimination tournament to determine the national champions of National Collegiate Athletic Association (NCAA) men's Division III collegiate basketball in the United States.

For the first time, the championship rounds were contested in Buffalo, New York.

Ohio Northern defeated Augustana (IL), 71–68, in the final, earning their first NCAA Division III national title.

The Polar Bears (28–2) were coached by first-year head coach Joe Campoli.

== Bracket ==
=== Top left sectional ===
First round
Fredonia	56
Ithaca	71

Second round
NYU	75
Ithaca	61
Eastern Connecticut	81
Salem State	71
Buffalo State	69
Geneseo	80
UMass Dartmouth	90
Westfield State	81

Sectional semifinals
NYU	73
Eastern Connecticut	78**
Geneseo	66
UMass Dartmouth	68

Sectional finals
Eastern Connecticut	64
UMass Dartmouth	75

=== Bottom left sectional ===
First round
Defiance	66
Otterbein	80
Rhodes	71
Virginia Wesleyan	62

Second round
Calvin	90
Otterbein	68
Emory & Henry	85
Maryville	61
Ohio Northern	88
Wooster	62
Rhodes	74
Christopher Newport	84

Sectional semifinals
Calvin	101
Emory & Henry	67
Ohio Northern	83
Christopher Newport	67

Sectional finals
Calvin	56
Ohio Northern	67

=== Top right sectional ===
First round
Johns Hopkins	49
Lebanon Valley	53
Catholic	91
Stockton State	106

Second round
Scranton	58
Lebanon Valley	56
Hunter	83
NJIT	70
Elizabethtown	64
Franklin & Marshall	78
Stockton State	61
Rowan	84

Sectional semifinals
Scranton	78
Hunter	62
Franklin & Marshall	68
Rowan	69

Sectional finals
Scranton	73
Rowan	80

=== Bottom right sectional ===
First round
Augustana (IL)	79
DePauw	66
Saint John's (MN)	80*
Wartburg	75
Manchester	68
Wisconsin–Whitewater	84

Second round
Cal Lutheran	56
La Verne	67
Beloit	66
Augustana (IL)	92
St. Thomas (MN)	75
Saint John's (MN)	61
Wisconsin–Whitewater	72
Wisconsin–Platteville	88

Sectional semifinals
La Verne	84
Augustana (IL)	87
St. Thomas (MN)	60
Wisconsin–Platteville	70

Sectional finals
Augustana (IL)	100
Wisconsin–Platteville	86

=== National finals ===
- Site: Buffalo, New York

National Semifinals
UMass Dartmouth	73
Ohio Northern	74
Rowan	81
Augustana (IL)	83

National Championship
Ohio Northern	71
Augustana (IL)	68
National Third-place
UMass Dartmouth	74
Rowan	95

== All-tournament team ==
- Kirk Anderson, Augustana (IL)
- Mark Gooden, Ohio Northern
- Aaron Madry, Ohio Northern
- Steven Haynes, UMass Dartmouth
- Keith Wood, Rowan

== See also ==
- 1993 NCAA Division I men's basketball tournament
- 1993 NCAA Division II men's basketball tournament
- 1993 NCAA Division III women's basketball tournament
- 1993 NAIA Division I men's basketball tournament
