= 1993 NCAA Division I women's basketball tournament =

American college basketball tournament

- Teams: 48
- Finals site: Omni Coliseum, Atlanta, Georgia
- Champions: Texas Tech Raiders (1st title, 1st title game, 1st Final Four)
- Runner-up: Ohio State (1st title game, 1st Final Four)
- Semifinalists: Iowa Hawkeyes (1st Final Four); Vanderbilt (1st Final Four)
- Winning coach: Marsha Sharp (1st title)
- MOP: Sheryl Swoopes (Texas Tech)

The 1993 NCAA Division I women's basketball tournament began on March 17 and ended on April 4. The tournament featured 48 teams. The Final Four consisted of Ohio State, Iowa, Vanderbilt, and Texas Tech, with Texas Tech defeating Ohio State 84–82 to win its first NCAA title. Texas Tech's Sheryl Swoopes was named the Most Outstanding Player of the tournament.

To date, this is the last time UConn has failed to advance to the Sweet Sixteen or later.

== Notable events ==
Ohio State failed to earn an invitation to the NCAA tournament in the prior two years, but in 1993, they added Katie Smith, the Gatorade National player of the year, to the roster, who helped lead the team to a 24–3 regular season record and an NCAA invitation as a 1 seed. The Buckeyes won their first two games easily, but faced a challenge in the East Regional final game against Virginia. The Cavaliers had been in the three previous Final Fours, including a national runner up finish in 1991. Despite 30 points from Virginia's Heather Burge, the Ohio State team won a close match, 75–73, to move on to their first ever NCAA Final Four. With time winding down, and trailing by two points, Virginia raced down the court and Dana Evans would hit a three-point shot, but it was disallowed, because the coach had called a timeout with 0.6 seconds left in the game. The inbounds pass was never touched, and went out of bounds, turning the ball over to Ohio State. Although they only had to inbound the ball, the inbounder stepped on the line, giving the ball back to Virginia. However, the inbounds pass by the Cavaliers was blocked, and Ohio State held on to win.

In the Mideast Regional, the Tennessee team was the top seed. Tennessee had won the National Championship three of the prior six years an advanced to the regional final with wins of 20 points or more in their first two games. Iowa, who had shared the championship of the Big Ten with Ohio State, was the second seed in the region, and faced Tennessee in the regional Final. Iowa was coached by Hall of Fame coach C. Vivian Stringer who had lost her husband to a heart attack during the season. The Tennessee team was trying to win the 500th victory for their coach Pat Summitt. The Iowa team would prevail, sending Iowa to their first ever Final Four (although the coach had been in the first NCAA Final four as coach of Cheyney State).

Texas Tech was the second seeded team in the West regional, where long time power Stanford was the top seed. However, Colorado upset Stanford in the regional semi-finals, while Texas Tech beat Washington, then USC to face Colorado in the regional finals. That game wasn't close, as Texas Tech, with Sheryl Swoopes, the "Michael Jordan of women's basketball" beat Colorado by 25 points to make it to their first ever Final Four. This set up a match up with Vanderbilt, the number one seeded winner of the Midwest Regional, who were also appearing in their first ever Final Four.

The Final Four included four teams who had never been in a Final Four before, the first time that had happened since the very first NCAA Final Four in 1982. In one semifinal, second seeded Texas Tech faced a number one seed in Vanderbilt, but Texas Tech would win easily, 60–46, while Vanderbilt set a tournament record for fewest points in a half, of a semi-final game, with only 20 points in the second half.

In the other semifinal, two Big Ten teams faced each other. Ohio State and Iowa had squared off twice in the regular season, with each winning their game at home. This time, they faced each other for the chance to play in the national championship game. At the end of regulation though, the game was tied, and they had to go to an overtime period. A timeout had been crucial in the Ohio State win over Virginia, and would become crucial in this game as well. Near the end of the game, the Iowa coach tried to signal a timeout, but the refs did not see the signal, and Iowa player Laurie Aaron tripped over a player on the floor with six seconds to go, losing the ball and turning it over. Ohio State recovered the ball and held on for a one-point victory 73–72.

In the championship game, Swoopes scored 23 points in the first half to help Texas Tech take a nine-point lead at half-time. The Buckeyes did not fold, and fought back to take a 55–54 lead midway through the second half. However, Swoopes continued her record-breaking night, and scored 24 points in the second half. She completed a three-point play on a layup and foul shot to give her team a seven-point lead with under a minute to go. Ohio State hit two three-pointers in the final seconds, but it wasn't enough, and the Red Raiders won their first national championship with a score of 84–82.

== Tournament records ==
- Points – Sheryl Swoopes scored 47 points in the championship game between Texas Tech and Ohio State, setting the record for most points scored in a Final Four game.
- Points in a half – Sheryl Swoopes scored 24 points in the second half of the championship game between Texas Tech and Ohio state, setting the record for most points scored in a single half of a Final Four game.
- Field goals made – Sheryl Swoopes scored 16 baskets in the championship game between Texas Tech and Ohio State, setting the record for most field goals scored in a Final Four game.
- Free throw percentage – Sheryl Swoopes hit eleven of eleven free throw attempts in the championship game between Texas Tech and Ohio State, tying the record for best free throw percentage in a Final Four game. The eleven free throws was the most of the perfect results.
- Free throws attempted – Vanderbilt attempted a single free throw in the semi-final game against Texas tech, the fewest free throw attempts in a Final Four game.
- Personal fouls – Texas Tech committed eight personal fouls against Vanderbilt in the semi-final game, committing the fewest personal fouls in a Final Four game.
- Points – Sheryl Swoopes scored 78 points in the two final four games in 1993, setting the record for most points scored in a Final Four.
- Free throw percentage – Rutgers hit four of fifteen free throw attempts (26.7%) which is the lowest free throw percentage in an NCAA tournament game.
- Points – Sheryl Swoopes scored 177 points in the 1993 NCAA tournament setting the record for most points scored in a tournament.
- Free throws – Sheryl Swoopes took 57 free throw shots in the 1993 NCAA tournament setting the record for most free throws attempted in a tournament.
- Free throw percentage – Sheryl Swoopes hit 108 of 133 free throw attempts(81.2%) in the 1993 NCAA tournament setting the record for the best free throw percentage in a tournament.

== Qualifying teams – automatic ==
Forty-eight teams were selected to participate in the 1993 NCAA Tournament. Twenty-three conferences were eligible for an automatic bid to the 1993 NCAA tournament.

Automatic bids
		Record		
Qualifying school	Conference	Regular Season	Conference	Seed
Bowling Green	MAC	25–4	17–1	10
BYU	WAC	24–4	13–1	12
Georgia Southern	Southern Conference	21–8	9–3	12
Kansas	Big Eight	21–8	9–5	8
Louisville	Metro	18–11	7–5	11
Miami	Big East	23–6	15–3	5
Missouri State	Missouri Valley Conference	21–8	14–2	10
Montana State	Big Sky Conference	22–6	13–1	7
NIU	Mid-Continent	24–5	15–1	11
Ohio State	Big Ten	24–3	16–2	1
Old Dominion	Colonial	21–7	14–0	10
Rutgers	Atlantic 10	21–8	12–2	9
San Diego	West Coast Conference	16–11	8–6	11
Saint Peter's	MAAC	18–10	9–5	12
Stanford	Pac-10	25–5	15–3	1
Stephen F. Austin	Southland	27–4	17–1	4
Tennessee Tech	Ohio Valley Conference	22–6	14–2	7
Texas Tech	Southwest	26–3	13–1	2
UC-Santa Barbara	Big West Conference	18–11	13–5	5
Vanderbilt	SEC	27–2	9–2	1
Virginia	ACC	24–5	13–3	2
Western Kentucky	Sun Belt Conference	23–6	13–1	4
Xavier	Midwestern Collegiate	21–8	11–5	12

== Qualifying teams – at-large ==
Twenty-five additional teams were selected to complete the forty-eight invitations.

At-large bids
		Record		
Qualifying school	Conference	Regular Season	Conference	Seed
Alabama	Southeastern	21–8	8–6	5
Auburn	Southeastern	24–3	9–2	3
UC-Berkeley	Pacific-10	18–9	10–8	9
Clemson	Atlantic Coast	18–10	8–8	5
Colorado	Big Eight	25–3	12–2	4
Connecticut	Big East	18–10	12–6	6
DePaul	Great Midwest	20–8	8–2	11
Florida	Southeastern	18–9	6–5	7
Georgetown	Big East	21–6	15–3	6
Georgia	Southeastern	20–12	4–7	8
Georgia Tech	Atlantic Coast	16–10	8–8	9
Iowa	Big Ten	24–3	16–2	2
Louisiana Tech	Sun Belt	23–5	13–1	6
Maryland	Atlantic Coast	22–7	11–5	2
Nebraska	Big Eight	22–7	10–4	6
North Carolina	Atlantic Coast	22–6	11–5	4
Northwestern	Big Ten	18–9	13–5	8
Oklahoma State	Big Eight	23–8	9–5	7
Penn State	Big Ten	22–5	14–4	3
San Diego State	Western Athletic	19–8	9–5	9
USC	Pacific-10	21–6	14–4	3
Tennessee	Southeastern	27–2	11–0	1
Texas	Southwest	22–7	13–1	3
Vermont	North Atlantic	28–0	14–0	8
Washington	Pacific-10	16–11	11–7	10

== Bids by conference ==
Twenty-three conferences earned an automatic bid. In fourteen cases, the automatic bid was the only representative from the conference. Two conferences, Great Midwest and North Atlantic sent a single representative as an at-large team. Twenty-three additional at-large teams were selected from nine of the conferences.

Bids	Conference	Teams
6	SEC	Vanderbilt, Alabama, Auburn, Florida, Georgia, Tennessee
5	ACC	Virginia, Clemson, Georgia Tech, Maryland, North Carolina
4	Big Eight	Kansas, Colorado, Nebraska, Oklahoma St.
4	Big Ten	Ohio St., Iowa, Northwestern, Penn St.
4	Pac-10	Stanford, California, Southern California, Washington
3	Big East	Miami Fla, Connecticut, Georgetown
2	Southwest	Texas Tech, Texas
2	Sun Belt	Western Ky., Louisiana Tech
2	WAC	BYU, San Diego St.
1	Atlantic 10	Rutgers
1	Big Sky	Montana St.
1	Big West	UC Santa Barb.
1	Colonial	Old Dominion
1	Great Midwest	DePaul
1	Metro	Louisville
1	MAAC	St. Peter's
1	MAC	Bowling Green
1	Mid-Continent	Northern Ill.
1	Midwestern	Xavier
1	MVC	Missouri St.
1	North Atlantic	Vermont
1	OVC	Tennessee Tech
1	Southern	Ga. Southern
1	Southland	Stephen F. Austin
1	West Coast	San Diego

== First and second rounds ==
1993 NCAA first round
1993 NCAA second round

In 1993, the field remained at 48 teams. The teams were seeded, and assigned to four geographic regions, with seeds 1–12 in each region. In Round 1, seeds 8 and 9 faced each other for the opportunity to face the 1 seed in the second round, seeds 7 and 10 played for the opportunity to face the 2 seed, seeds 5 and 12 played for the opportunity to face the 4 seed, and seeds 6 and 11 played for the opportunity to face the 3 seed. In the first two rounds, the higher seed was given the opportunity to host the first-round game. In most cases, the higher seed accepted the opportunity. The exception:

- Second seeded Iowa played seventh seeded Old Dominion at Old Dominion

Old Dominion served as a host for the first round as well as the second round, so it is listed twice.

The following table lists the region, host school, venue and the thirty-two first and second round locations:

Region	Rnd	Host	Venue	City	State
East	1	University of Miami	Knight Center Complex	Coral Gables	Florida
East	1	Bowling Green State University	Anderson Arena	Bowling Green	Ohio
East	1	Georgetown University	McDonough Gymnasium	Washington	District of Columbia
East	1	University of Vermont	Patrick Gym	Burlington	Vermont
East	2	Western Kentucky University	E.A. Diddle Arena	Bowling Green	Kentucky
East	2	Pennsylvania State University	Recreation Building (Rec Hall)	University Park	Pennsylvania
East	2	Ohio State University	St. John Arena	Columbus	Ohio
East	2	University of Virginia	University Hall (University of Virginia)	Charlottesville	Virginia
Mideast	1	Northwestern University	Welsh-Ryan Arena	Evanston	Illinois
Mideast	1	Old Dominion University	Old Dominion University Fieldhouse	Norfolk	Virginia
Mideast	1	University of Alabama	Coleman Coliseum	Tuscaloosa	Alabama
Mideast	1	University of Connecticut	Harry A. Gampel Pavilion	Storrs	Connecticut
Mideast	2	Old Dominion University	Old Dominion University Fieldhouse	Norfolk	Virginia
Mideast	2	University of North Carolina	Carmichael Auditorium	Chapel Hill	North Carolina
Mideast	2	University of Tennessee	Thompson-Boling Arena	Knoxville	Tennessee
Mideast	2	Auburn University	Memorial Coliseum (Beard–Eaves–Memorial Coliseum)	Auburn	Alabama
Midwest	1	University of Kansas	Allen Field House	Lawrence	Kansas
Midwest	1	Clemson University	Littlejohn Coliseum	Clemson	South Carolina
Midwest	1	Missouri State University	Hammons Student Center	Springfield	Missouri
Midwest	1	Louisiana Tech University	Thomas Assembly Center	Ruston	Louisiana
Midwest	2	Vanderbilt University	Striplin Gymnasium	Nashville	Tennessee
Midwest	2	Stephen F. Austin University	William R. Johnson Coliseum	Nacogdoches	Texas
Midwest	2	University of Maryland	Cole Field House	College Park	Maryland
Midwest	2	University of Texas	Frank Erwin Center	Austin	Texas
West	1	University of California, Santa Barbara	UC Santa Barbara Events Center	Santa Barbara	California
West	1	University of Georgia	Georgia Coliseum (Stegeman Coliseum)	Athens	Georgia
West	1	University of Washington	Hec Edmundson Pavilion	Seattle	Washington
West	1	University of Nebraska–Lincoln	Bob Devaney Sports Center	Lincoln	Nebraska
West	2	Stanford University	Maples Pavilion	Stanford	California
West	2	Texas Tech University	Lubbock Municipal Coliseum	Lubbock	Texas
West	2	University of Southern California	Los Angeles Memorial Sports Arena	Los Angeles	California
West	2	University of Colorado	CU Events Center (Coors Events Center)	Boulder	Colorado

== Regionals and Final Four ==
1993 NCAA regionals and Final Four

The Regionals, named for the general location, were held from March 25 to March 27 at these sites:

- East Regional Richmond Coliseum, Richmond, Virginia (Host: Virginia Commonwealth)
- Mideast Regional Carver–Hawkeye Arena, Iowa City, Iowa (Host: University of Iowa)
- Midwest Regional William R. Johnson Coliseum, Nacogdoches, Texas (Host: Stephen F. Austin University)
- West Regional Dahlberg Arena, Missoula, Montana (Host: University of Montana)

Each regional winner advanced to the Final Four, held April 3 and April 4 in Atlanta, Georgia at the Omni Coliseum, (Host: Georgia Tech)

== Bids by state ==
The forty-eight teams came from twenty-seven states, plus Washington, D.C. California had the most teams with six bids. Twenty-three states did not have any teams receiving bids.

NCAA Women's basketball Tournament invitations by state 1993

Bids	State	Teams
6	California	San Diego, Stanford, UC Santa Barb., California, San Diego St., Southern California
3	Georgia	Ga. Southern, Georgia, Georgia Tech
3	Illinois	Northern Ill., DePaul, Northwestern
3	Ohio	Bowling Green, Ohio St., Xavier
3	Tennessee	Tennessee Tech, Vanderbilt, Tennessee
3	Texas	Stephen F. Austin, Texas Tech, Texas
2	Alabama	Alabama, Auburn
2	Florida	Miami Fla, Florida
2	Kentucky	Louisville, Western Ky.
2	New Jersey	Rutgers, St. Peter's
2	Virginia	Old Dominion, Virginia
1	Colorado	Colorado
1	Connecticut	Connecticut
1	District of Columbia	Georgetown
1	Iowa	Iowa
1	Kansas	Kansas
1	Louisiana	Louisiana Tech
1	Maryland	Maryland
1	Missouri	Missouri St.
1	Montana	Montana St.
1	Nebraska	Nebraska
1	North Carolina	North Carolina
1	Oklahoma	Oklahoma St.
1	Pennsylvania	Penn St.
1	South Carolina	Clemson
1	Utah	BYU
1	Vermont	Vermont
1	Washington	Washington

== Brackets ==
First and second-round games played at higher seed except where noted.

=== East regional – Richmond, VA ===
First round March 17
8	Vermont	74
9	Rutgers	80
5	Miami (FL)	61
12	St. Peter's	44
7	Bowling Green	67
10	Florida	69
6	Georgetown	76
11	Northern Illinois	74

Second round March 20–21
1	Ohio St.	91
9	Rutgers	60
4	Western Kentucky	78
5	Miami (FL)	63
2	Virginia	69
10	Florida	55
3	Penn St.	67
6	Georgetown	68

Regional semifinals March 25
1	Ohio St.	86
4	Western Kentucky	73
2	Virginia	77
6	Georgetown	57

Regional finals March 27
1	Ohio St.	75
2	Virginia	73

=== Mideast regional – Iowa City, IA ===
First round March 17
8	Northwestern	90
9	Georgia Tech	62
5	Alabama	102
12	Georgia Southern	70
7	Old Dominion	77
10	Tennessee Tech	60
6	Connecticut	71
11	Louisville	74

Second round March 20–21
1	Tennessee	89
8	Northwestern	66
4	North Carolina	74
5	Alabama	73^{OT}
2	Iowa	82
7	at Old Dominion	56
3	Auburn	66
11	Louisville	61

Regional semifinals March 25
1	Tennessee	74
4	North Carolina	54
2	Iowa	63
3	Auburn	50

Regional finals March 27
1	Tennessee	56
2	Iowa	72

=== Midwest regional – Nacogdoches, Texas ===
First round March 17
8	Kansas	47
9	California	62
5	Clemson	70
12	Xavier	64
7	SW Missouri St.	86
10	Oklahoma St.	71
6	Louisiana Tech	70
11	DePaul	59

Second round March 20–21
1	Vanderbilt	82
9	California	63
4	Stephen F. Austin	89
5	Clemson	78
2	Maryland	82
7	SW Missouri St.	86
3	Texas	78
6	Louisiana Tech	82

Regional semifinals March 25
1	Vanderbilt	59
4	Stephen F. Austin	56
7	SW Missouri St.	43
6	Louisiana Tech	59

Regional finals March 27
1	Vanderbilt	58
6	Louisiana Tech	53

=== West regional – Missoula, MT ===
First round March 17
8	Georgia	85
9	San Diego St.	68
5	UC Santa Barbara	88
12	BYU	79
7	Washington	80
10	Montana St.	51
6	Nebraska	81
11	San Diego	58

Second round March 20–21
1	Stanford	93
8	Georgia	60
4	Colorado	81
5	UC Santa Barbara	54
2	Texas Tech	70
7	Washington	64
3	Southern California	78
6	Nebraska	60

Regional semifinals March 25
1	Stanford	67
4	Colorado	80
2	Texas Tech	87
3	Southern California	67

Regional finals March 27
4	Colorado	54
2	Texas Tech	79

=== Final Four – Atlanta, GA ===
National semifinals April 3
1E	Ohio St.	73
2ME	Iowa	72^{OT}
1MW	Vanderbilt	46
2W	Texas Tech	60

National championship April 4
1E	Ohio St.	82
2W	Texas Tech	84

== Record by conference ==
Fifteen conferences had more than one bid, or at least one win in NCAA Tournament play:

Conference	# of Bids	Record	Win %	Round of 32	Sweet Sixteen	Elite Eight	Final Four	Championship Game
Southeastern	6	9–6	.600	6	3	2	1	–
Atlantic Coast	5	4–5	.444	4	2	1	–	–
Big Ten	4	8–4	.667	4	2	2	2	1
Pacific-10	4	4–4	.500	4	2	–	–	–
Big Eight	4	3–4	.429	2	1	1	–	–
Big East	3	3–3	.500	2	1	–	–	–
Southwest	2	5–1	.833	2	1	1	1	1
Sun Belt	2	4–2	.667	2	2	1	–	–
Western Athletic	2	0–2	–	–	–	–	–	–
Missouri Valley	1	2–1	.667	1	1	–	–	–
Atlantic 10	1	1–1	.500	1	–	–	–	–
Big West	1	1–1	.500	1	–	–	–	–
Colonial	1	1–1	.500	1	–	–	–	–
Metro	1	1–1	.500	1	–	–	–	–
Southland	1	1–1	.500	1	1	–	–	–

Ten conferences went 0-1: Big Sky Conference, Great Midwest Conference, MAAC, MAC, Mid-Continent, Midwestern Collegiate, North Atlantic Conference, Ohio Valley Conference, Southern Conference, and West Coast Conference

== All-Tournament team ==
- Sheryl Swoopes, Texas Tech
- Krista Kirkland, Texas Tech
- Nikki Keyton, Ohio State
- Katie Smith, Ohio State
- Heidi Gillingham, Vanderbilt

== Game officials ==
- June Courteau (semifinal)
- Larry Sheppard (semifinal)
- Bob Gallagher (semifinal)
- Carla Fujimoto (semifinal)
- Sally Bell (final)
- Dee Kantner (final)

== See also ==
- 1993 NCAA Division I men's basketball tournament
- 1993 NCAA Division II women's basketball tournament
- 1993 NCAA Division III women's basketball tournament
- 1993 NAIA Division I women's basketball tournament
- 1993 NAIA Division II women's basketball tournament
