= Madison Booker =

American basketball player

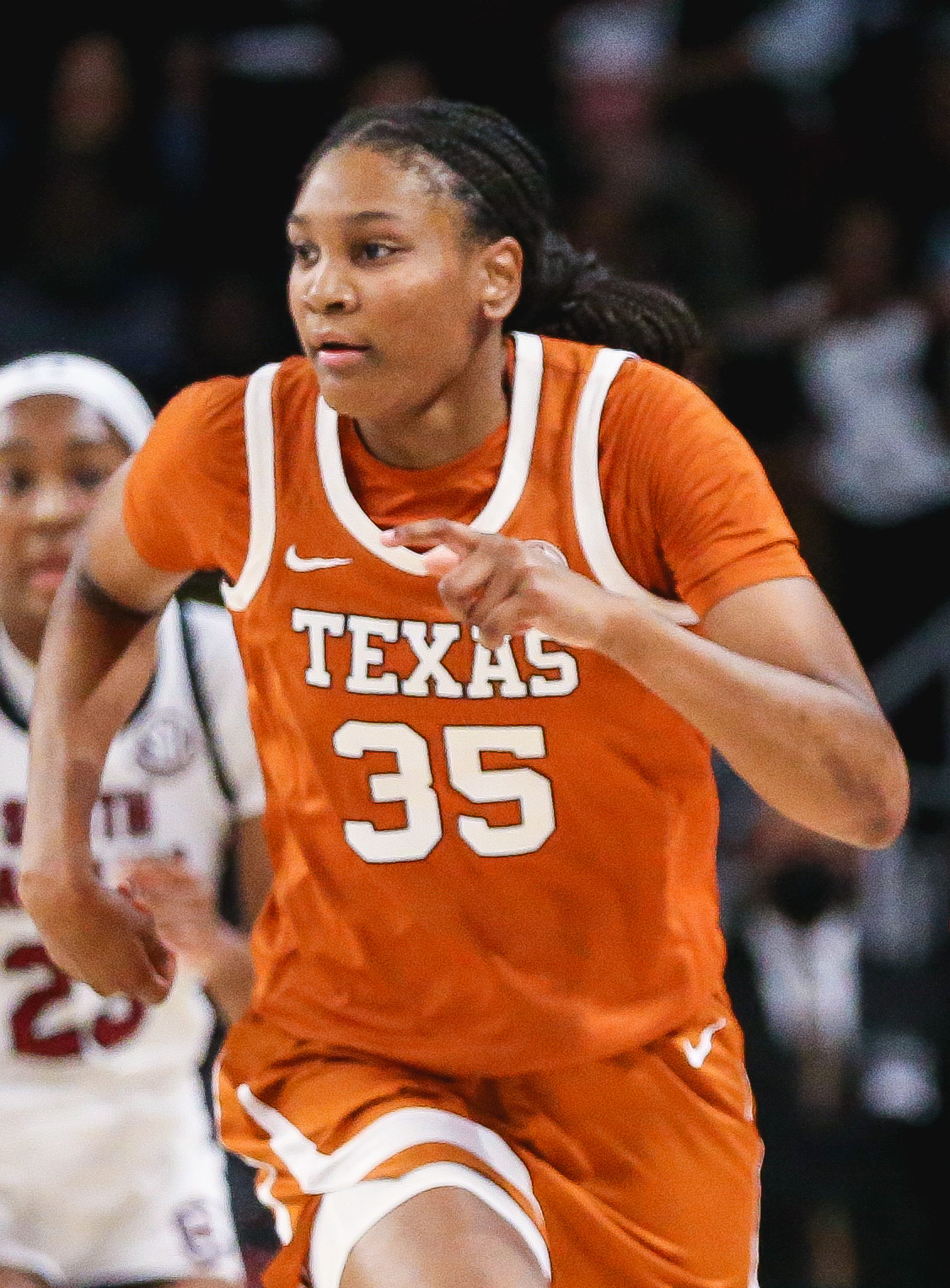
- Booker with Texas in 2025

No. 35 – Texas Longhorns
- Position: Small forward
- Conference: Southeastern Conference

Personal information
- Born: April 29, 2005 (age 21)
- Listed height: 6 ft 1 in (1.85 m)

Career information
- High school: Germantown (Gluckstadt, Mississippi)
- College: Texas (2023–present)

Career highlights
- SEC tournament MVP (2026); 3× Cheryl Miller Award (2024–2026); 3× WBCA Coaches' All-American (2024–2026); 2× First-team All-American – AP (2025, 2026); 2× Second-team All-America – USBWA (2025, 2026); Second-team All-American – AP (2024); Third-team All-American – USBWA (2024); SEC Player of the Year (2025); Big 12 co-Player of the Year (2024); 2× First-team All-SEC (2025, 2026); First-team All-Big 12 (2024); Big 12 Freshman of the Year (2024); Big-12 All-Freshman Team (2024); Big 12 Tournament MOP (2024); McDonald's All-American (2023); Nike Hoop Summit (2023); Mississippi Miss Basketball (2023)
Medals
Women's basketball
Representing the United States
FIBA AmeriCup
Gold medal – first place	2025 Chile
FIBA Under-19 World Cup
Gold medal – first place	2023 Spain	Team
FIBA Under-17 World Cup
Gold medal – first place	2022 Hungary	Team
FIBA Under-16 Americas Championship
Gold medal – first place	2021 Mexico	Team

Madison Booker (born April 29, 2005) is an American college basketball player for the Texas Longhorns of the Southeastern Conference (SEC).

== High school career ==
Booker played basketball for Germantown High School in Gluckstadt, Mississippi. As a senior, she led her team to its first state championship at the Class 6A state tournament. Booker was selected to play in the McDonald's All-American Girls Game and was named Mississippi Miss Basketball for Class 6A and Mississippi Gatorade Player of the Year. Rated a five-star recruit by ESPN, she committed to playing college basketball for Texas over offers from Duke and Tennessee.

== College career ==
Booker entered her freshman season at Texas as the team's starting small forward. She moved to point guard and a leading role following a season-ending injury to Rori Harmon. In this role, she set the program freshman assist record with 185 assists. Booker averaged 20.2 points, 5.4 rebounds, and 5.2 assists. She was named MOP of the Big 12 Tournament, scoring 26 points, 6 rebounds, and 5 assists against Iowa State. Booker won Big 12 Freshman of the Year. She was the first freshman to win the Cheryl Miller Award and Big 12 Player of the Year, sharing the latter with Skylar Vann. In the postseason, she received second and third-team All-American honors from AP and USBWA.

As a sophomore, Booker averaged 16.3 points and 6.6 rebounds. She reached 1000 points in 61 games, the second fastest in program history to do so. In the postseason, she led the Longhorns to their first Final Four since 2003, ultimately losing to South Carolina. Booker won the Cheryl Miller Award for the second time in a row, and was named SEC Player of the Year. She was named a first-team All-American by AP, and was as a finalist for the Wade Trophy and Wooden Award.

== National team career ==
Booker helped the United States win a gold medal at the 2021 FIBA Under-16 Women's Americas Championship in Mexico, where she averaged 6.2 points and 6.7 rebounds per game. At the 2022 FIBA Under-17 Women's World Cup in Hungary, she averaged 5.6 points, four rebounds and 2.3 assists per game en route to a gold medal. Booker won her third gold medal at the 2023 FIBA Under-19 Women's World Cup in Spain, averaging 7.2 points and five rebounds per game.

== Career statistics ==
Legend
GP	Games played	GS	Games started	MPG	Minutes per game	RPG	Rebounds per game
APG	Assists per game	SPG	Steals per game	BPG	Blocks per game	PPG	Points per game
TO	Turnovers per game	FG%	Field-goal percentage	3P%	3-point field-goal percentage	FT%	Free-throw percentage
**Bold**	Career best	°	League leader

=== College ===
Year	Team	GP	GS	MPG	FG%	3P%	FT%	RPG	APG	SPG	BPG	TO	PPG
2023–24	Texas	37	37	30.8	45.7	30.6	**87.6**	5.0	**5.0**	1.5	0.4	**2.9**	**16.5**
2024–25	Texas	**38**	**38**	**31.3**	**46.4**	**40.3**	82.8	**6.6**	2.7	**1.6**	**0.5**	2.1	16.3
Career		75	75	31.1	46.1	35.5	85.4	5.8	3.8	1.5	0.4	2.5	16.4

== Personal life ==
Booker is a fan of NBA player Kevin Durant, and wears the number 35 after him. Her father, Carlos Booker, played college basketball for Southern Miss.

=== Business interests ===
On July 21, 2025, Booker was signed by Unrivaled, a 3x3 basketball league, to NIL deals as part of "The Future is Unrivaled Class of 2025".
