= Big 12 Conference Women's Basketball Freshman of the Year =

- Awarded for: the top women's basketball freshman in the Big 12 Conference
- Country: United States
- Presented by: Phillips 66
- First award: 1997
- Currently held by: Jaliya Davis, Kansas

The Big 12 Conference Women's Basketball Freshman of the Year is an annual college basketball award presented to the top women's basketball freshman in the Big 12 Conference.

== Key ==
†	Co-Freshman of the Year
*	Awarded a national Freshman of the Year award: USBWA National Freshman of the Year (USBWA) WBCA Freshman of the Year (WBCA)

== Winners ==
Season	Player	School	National Freshman of the Year Awards	Source(s)
1996–97	Julie Helm	Missouri	—	
1997–98	Megan Taylor	Iowa State	—	
1998–99	Laneishea Caufield	Oklahoma	—	
1999–2000	Plenette Pierson	Texas Tech	—	
2000–01	Nicole Ohlde	Kansas State	—	
2001–02	Heather Schreiber	Texas	—	
2002–03	Erin Grant†	Texas Tech	—	
2002–03	Chelsi Welch†	Oklahoma	—	
2003–04	Tiffany Jackson-Jones*	Texas	USBWA	
2004–05	Morenike Atunrase	Texas A&M	—	
2005–06	Courtney Paris*	Oklahoma	USBWA	
2006–07	Andrea Riley	Oklahoma State	—	
2007–08	Danielle Robinson	Oklahoma	—	
2008–09	Whitney Hand	Oklahoma	—	
2009–10	Brittney Griner*	Baylor	USBWA	
2010–11	Odyssey Sims*	Baylor	USBWA	
2011–12	Liz Donohoe	Oklahoma State	—	
2012–13	Imani McGee-Stafford	Texas	—	
2013–14	Nina Davis	Baylor	—	
2014–15	Gabbi Ortiz	Oklahoma	—	
2015–16	Tynice Martin	West Virginia	—	
2016–17	Joyner Holmes	Texas	—	
2017–18	Shaina Pellington	Oklahoma	—	
2018–19	Chrislyn Carr	Texas Tech	—	
2019–20	Ayoka Lee	Kansas State	—	
2020–21	Lexi Donarski	Iowa State	—	
2021–22	Rori Harmon	Texas	—	
2022–23	Darianna Littlepage-Buggs	Baylor	—	
2023–24	Madison Booker	Texas	—	
2024–25	Delaney Gibb	BYU	—	
2025–26	Jaliya Davis	Kansas	—	

== Winners by school ==
School (year joined) (Note: Reflects the calendar year in which the school joined the Big 12.)	Winners	Years (Note: Reflects the calendar year in which the basketball season ends.)
Oklahoma (1996) (Note: Oklahoma and Texas left for the SEC in 2024.)	7	1999, 2003, 2006, 2008, 2009, 2015, 2018
Texas (1996)	6	2002, 2004, 2013, 2017, 2022, 2024
Baylor (1996)	4	2010, 2011, 2014, 2023
Texas Tech (1996)	3	2000, 2003, 2019
Iowa State (1996)	2	1998, 2021
Kansas State (1996)	2	2001, 2020
Oklahoma State (1996)	2	2007, 2012
Kansas (1996)	1	2026
BYU (2023)	1	2025
Missouri (1996) (Note: Missouri and Texas A&M left in 2012 to join the SEC.)	1	1997
Texas A&M (1996)	1	2005
West Virginia (2012)	1	2016
Arizona (2024)	0	—
Arizona State (2024)	0	—
Cincinnati (2023)	0	—
Colorado (1996/2024) (Note: Colorado left in 2011 to join what is now known as the Pac-12, but rejoined the Big 12 in 2024.)	0	—
Houston (2023)	0	—
Nebraska (1996) (Note: Nebraska left in 2011 to join the Big Ten.)	0	—
TCU (2012)	0	—
UCF (2023)	0	—
Utah (2024)	0	—
