= 1983 Southwest Conference women's basketball tournament =

- Classification: Division I
- Teams: 9
- Site: Gregory Gym; Austin, Texas
- Champions: Texas (1st title)
- Winning coach: Jody Conradt (1st title)
- MVP: Annette Smith (Texas)

1982–83 Southwest Conference women's basketball standings
	Conf.				Overall
Team	W		L	PCT	W		L	PCT
No. 3 Texas†	8	–	0	1.000	30	–	3	.909
Arkansas	6	–	2	.750	21	–	8	.724
Texas Tech	6	–	2	.750	22	–	9	.710
Houston	5	–	3	.625	17	–	11	.607
SMU	4	–	4	.500	14	–	14	.500
Baylor	4	–	4	.500	16	–	14	.533
Texas A&M	2	–	6	.250	11	–	16	.407
Rice	1	–	7	.125	8	–	18	.308
TCU	0	–	8	.000	5	–	23	.179
† 1983 SWC tournament winner Rankings from AP Poll

The 1983 Southwest Conference women's basketball tournament was held March 10–13, 1983, at Gregory Gym in Austin, Texas.

Number 1 seed Texas defeated 2 seed Arkansas 80–54 to win their first championship and receive the conference's automatic bid to the 1983 NCAA tournament.

== Format and seeding ==
The tournament consisted of a 9 team single-elimination tournament with the 8 and 9 seeded teams playing in a play-in game to decide the 8th spot.

Place	Seed	Team	Conference			Overall		
Place	Seed	Team	W	L	%	W	L	%
1	1	Texas	8	0	1.000	30	3	.909
2	2	Arkansas	6	2	.750	21	8	.724
2	3	Texas Tech	6	2	.750	22	9	.710
4	4	Houston	5	3	.625	17	11	.607
5	5	SMU	4	4	.500	14	14	.500
5	6	Baylor	4	4	.500	16	14	.533
7	7	Texas A&M	2	6	.250	11	16	.407
8	8	Rice	1	7	.125	8	18	.308
9	9	TCU	0	8	.000	5	23	.179

== Tournament ==
First round Thursday, March 10
8	Rice	80
9	TCU	69

Quarterfinals; Friday, March 11
1	Texas	100
8	Rice	49
4	Houston	95
5	SMU	65
3	Texas Tech	56
6	Baylor	62
2	Arkansas	66
7	Texas A&M	57

Semifinals; Saturday, March 12
1	Texas	86
4	Houston	62
6	Baylor	62
2	Arkansas	65

Finals; Sunday, March 13
1	Texas	80
2	Arkansas	54
Third place
4	Houston (OT)	65
6	Baylor	63
