= 1994 Southwest Conference women's basketball tournament =

- Classification: Division I
- Teams: 8
- Site: Moody Coliseum; Dallas, Texas
- Champions: Texas (9th title)
- Winning coach: Jody Conradt (9th title)
- MVP: Connie Robinson (Texas Tech)

1993–94 Southwest Conference women's basketball standings
	Conf.				Overall
Team	W		L	PCT	W		L	PCT
No. 6 Texas Tech	12	–	2	.857	28	–	5	.848
Texas A&M	11	–	3	.786	23	–	8	.742
No. 25 Texas†	10	–	4	.714	22	–	9	.710
SMU	8	–	6	.571	18	–	9	.667
Houston	5	–	9	.357	11	–	15	.423
Rice	5	–	9	.357	13	–	14	.481
Baylor	4	–	10	.286	13	–	14	.481
TCU	1	–	13	.071	5	–	20	.200
† 1994 SWC tournament winner Rankings from AP Poll

The 1994 Southwest Conference women's basketball tournament was held March 9–12, 1994, at Moody Coliseum in Dallas, Texas.

Number 3 seed Texas defeated number 1 seed Texas Tech 71–69 to win their ninth championship and receive the conference's automatic bid to the 1994 NCAA tournament.

Texas Tech, Texas A&M, and SMU received at-large bids to the NCAA tournament.

== Format and seeding ==
The tournament consisted of an 8 team single-elimination tournament.

Place	Seed	Team	Conference			Overall		
Place	Seed	Team	W	L	%	W	L	%
1	1	Texas Tech	12	2	.857	28	5	.848
2	2	Texas A&M	11	3	.786	23	8	.742
3	3	Texas	10	4	.714	22	9	.710
4	4	SMU	8	6	.571	18	9	.667
5	5	Houston	5	9	.357	11	15	.423
5	6	Rice	5	9	.357	13	14	.481
7	7	Baylor	4	10	.286	13	14	.481
8	8	TCU	1	13	.071	5	20	.200

== Tournament ==
Quarterfinal; Wednesday, March 9
1	Texas Tech	103
8	TCU	55
4	SMU	82
5	Houston	73
3	Texas	102
6	Rice	57
2	Texas A&M	85
7	Baylor	72

Semifinals; Friday, March 11
1	Texas Tech	99
4	SMU	78
3	Texas	80
2	Texas A&M	75

Finals; Saturday, March 12
1	Texas Tech	69
3	Texas	71
