= Darianna Littlepage-Buggs =

American basketball player (born 2003)

No. 5 – Washington Mystics
- Position: Guard/Forward
- League: WNBA

Personal information
- Born: September 23, 2003 (age 22)
- Listed height: 6 ft 1 in (1.85 m)
- Listed weight: 159 lb (72 kg)

Career information
- High school: Classen (Oklahoma City, Oklahoma)
- College: Baylor (2022–2026)
- WNBA draft: 2026: 2nd round, 30th overall pick
- Drafted by: Washington Mystics
- Playing career: 2026–present

Career history
- 2026–present: Washington Mystics

Career highlights
- First-team All-Big 12 (2025); Second-team All-Big 12 (2026); Big 12 All-Defensive Team (2026); Big 12 Freshman of the Year (2023); Big 12 All-Freshman Team (2023); McDonald's All-American (2022)
- Stats at WNBA.com
- Stats at Basketball Reference

Darianna Littlepage-Buggs (born September 23, 2003) is an American professional basketball player for the Washington Mystics of the Women's National Basketball Association (WNBA). She played college basketball at Baylor.

== College career ==
On December 8, 2021, Littlepage-Buggs signed her National Letter of Intent (NLI) to play college basketball at Baylor.

During the 2022–23 season, in her freshman year, she appeared in all 33 games, with 21 starts, and led the team with 9.2 rebounds per game and 28 total blocks. She reached double-figure scoring 19 times and double-figure rebounding 15 times, and led the team with 14 double-doubles. She was named Big 12 Freshman of the Week eight times, the most in Baylor history, and the second-most in Big 12 Conference history. Following the season she was named a unanimous selection to the Big 12 All-Freshman Team and Big 12 Freshman of the Year.

During the 2023–24 season, in her sophomore year, she appeared in 33 games, with 32 starts, and averaged 10.5 points and 7.2 rebounds per game. She recorded 18 double-digit scoring games, and nine double-figure rebound games. During the 2024–25 season, in her junior year, she appeared in 28 games, with 26 starts, and averaged 13.8 points and 10.0 rebounds per game. She led the team with 11 double-doubles. She recorded a career-high 20 rebounds on December 8, 2024, against UNLV. She became the eighth player in program history to record 20 points and 20 rebounds in a single game. Following the season she was named to the first-team All-Big 12.

During the 2025–26 season, in her senior year, she started all 34 games and averaged 10.6 points and 10.1 rebounds per game. She recorded 24 double-digit scoring games, and 19 double-figure rebound games. She became the fourth player in Big 12 history to repeat as the league’s rebounding leader in consecutive seasons. Following the season she was named to the second-team All-Big 12 and Big 12 All-Defensive Team. On January 4, 2026, against Iowa State she recorded a career-high tying 20 rebounds, becoming the fifth Baylor player all-time to record 20 or more rebounds in a singles game twice. The next game against Colorado on January 8, she recorded 10 points and 12 rebounds, and surpassed 1,000 career rebounds. She became the ninth player in program history to surpass the milestone.

She finished her collegiate career with 1,164 rebounds, averaging 9.1 per game. She ranked fourth in program history in career rebounds and rebounding average, and fifth in double-doubles with 44. She also ranked eighth in Big 12 history in career rebounds.

== Professional career ==
On April 13, 2026, Littlepage-Buggs was drafted in the second round, 30th overall, by the Washington Mystics in the 2026 WNBA draft. She subsequently signed a development player contract with the Mystics.
