= Texas Longhorns women's basketball =

Women's basketball team of the University of Texas

2026–27 Texas Longhorns women's basketball team
- University: University of Texas at Austin
- Head coach: Vic Schaefer (7th season)
- Location: Austin, Texas
- Arena: Moody Center (capacity: 10,000, expandable to 15,000)
- Conference: SEC
- Nickname: Longhorns
- Colors: Burnt orange and white

NCAA Division I tournament champions
- 1986
Other NCAA Division I tournament results
Final Four	1986, 1987, 2003, 2025, 2026
Elite Eight	1983, 1984, 1986, 1987, 1988, 1989, 1990, 2003, 2016, 2021, 2022, 2024, 2025, 2026
Sweet Sixteen	1983, 1984, 1985, 1986, 1987, 1988, 1989, 1990, 2002, 2003, 2004, 2015, 2016, 2017, 2018, 2021, 2022, 2024, 2025, 2026
Appearances	1983, 1984, 1985, 1986, 1987, 1988, 1989, 1990, 1991, 1992, 1993, 1994, 1996, 1997, 1999, 2000, 2001, 2002, 2003, 2004, 2005, 2008, 2009, 2010, 2011, 2012, 2014, 2015, 2016, 2017, 2018, 2019, 2021, 2022, 2023, 2024, 2025, 2026

AIAW tournament runner-up
- 1982
Other AIAW tournament results
Final Four	1982
Quarterfinals	1982
Second round	1982
Appearances	1980, 1981, 1982

Conference tournament champions
- AIAW Texas: 1981, 1982 SWC: 1983, 1984, 1985, 1986, 1987, 1988, 1989, 1990, 1994 Big 12: 2003, 2022, 2024 SEC: 2026

Conference regular-season champions
- SWC: 1983, 1984, 1985, 1986, 1987, 1988, 1989, 1990, 1993, 1996 Big 12: 2003, 2004, 2023 SEC: 2025

Uniforms
Home	Away

The Texas Longhorns women's basketball team represents the University of Texas at Austin in NCAA Division I intercollegiate women's basketball competition. The Longhorns compete in the SEC Conference.

Under head coach Jody Conradt, the second NCAA Division I basketball coach to win 900 career games (after Tennessee's Pat Summitt), the Longhorns won the 1986 national championship. Conradt retired after the 2006–07 season, and was replaced by Duke head coach Gail Goestenkors. She resigned after five seasons and was replaced by Karen Aston, whose contract was not renewed following the 2019–20 season. In April 2020, Vic Schaefer was named the program's fifth head coach.

From 1977 to 2022, Texas women's basketball played its home games in the Frank Erwin Special Events Center, where the team compiled a 576–118 (.830) record. The final game played in the Erwin Center was an NCAA second-round victory over Utah, 78–56, on March 20, 2022. Since the start of the 2022–23 season, the team has played in the $388 million Moody Center.

== History ==
The University of Texas held its first basketball competition in 1900, six years before Magnus Mainland started the men's team at Texas. The games in the first few years were intramural. By 1906, the school was playing other institutions, although only home games, not off-campus. Full varsity intercollegiate competition in women's basketball began in 1974. Through the 2021–22 season, the Longhorns rank sixth in total victories and eighth in all-time win percentage among all NCAA Division I women's college basketball programs, with an all-time win–loss record of 1161–424 (.732).

The Longhorns have won 22 total conference championships (12 regular-season conference titles and 10 conference tournament titles) in women's basketball and have made 38 total appearances in the NCAA tournament (57–35 overall record), reaching the NCAA Final Four five times (1986, 1987, 2003, 2025, 2026) and the NCAA regional finals (Elite Eight) 14 times. Texas won the 1986 NCAA Championship to finish the 1985–86 season with a 34–0 record. Through the 2021–22 season, Texas ranks 10th in all-time NCAA Tournament victories (48), trailing Connecticut (130), Tennessee (128), Stanford (99), Notre Dame (69), Louisiana Tech (65), Duke (61), Georgia (58), Baylor (54) and North Carolina (49).

=== Early years (1900–1966) ===
The very first women's basketball games occurred in 1892, at Smith College, under the direction of Senda Berenson Abbott. Shortly thereafter, Clara Baer brought the game to Louisiana. The details of how the game came to Texas is not known for certain, but in 1900, Eleanore Norvell organized the first basketball game at the University of Texas. Norvell was originally from Oklahoma, and came to Texas to direct the physical education department. She has been at Texas for less than a year when she introduced basketball to students at the school. The first recorded game occurred on Saturday January 13, 1900. The teams played four ten-minute quarters—the final score of that first game was 3–2.

Although the men's game and women's game both had their roots in the Naismith rules, the first set of rules left a lot to be specified, and the rules for the women's game developed differently than for the men. Both Senda Berensen and Clara Baer used Naismith's rules as an inspiration, but developed their own set of rules, including marked areas on the court limiting the movement of players to their respective sections. Some of these rules were motivated by the prevailing assumptions of "female frailty and dependence".

Texas would play limited intercollegiate basketball between 1903 and 1921. Eunice Aden was captain of the basketball team in 1903, took over coaching duties in 1905 and became director of physical education in 1911. Opportunities in basketball grew, but only in a limited way. Intercollegiate play existed, but the school did not allow off-campus games. When Aden retired in 1921, she was replaced by Anna Hiss, who would run the physical education department until 1957. While she was called a visionary for her role in directing physical education and intramurals, she was "dead-set against intercollegiate athletics for women". The limited intercollegiate play under Aden came to an end, with basketball now limited to intramurals and interclass play.

The ascension of Hiss to the head of the department roughly coincided with the influence of Lou Henry Hoover, First Lady of the United States. In 1923, Hoover was head of the Girl Scouts of the United States. Although Hoover was an advocate of sports, she felt that highly competitive sports were detrimental. Hoover helped to found the Women's Division of the National Amateur Athletic Foundation (WDNAAF). This foundation passed a resolution in 1925 banning extramural competition. The following year, Hiss formed an organization which voted "condemn intercollegiate competition for women, and to endorse the intramural/interclass model".

Hiss supported many activities, including tennis, golf, archery, swimming and interpretive dance, but was opposed to team sports. In general, "artistry was favored over athleticism". She led an unsuccessful protest against American woman participation in the Olympics of 1928, 1932, and 1936. She was the driving force behind the construction of a Women's Gymnasium (named in her honor after her death). While it was a substantial resource for women's athletics, it was designed to fit her beliefs—the courts were too small for a proper basketball game, and had no room for spectators and the swimming pool was deliberately shorter than Olympic length.

While basketball was not officially supported as a school-sponsored sport in the 1920s and 30s, it was still played by many groups. The interclass games were de-emphasized, but fraternities and sororities played the game, as well as organizations such as the YWCA, industrial leagues and AAU teams.

=== Intermediate years (1967–1974) Club Level ===
After Hiss's departure, basketball at Texas began to grow, although it would be almost a decade until it became a full varsity sport. The University of Texas Sports Association (UTSA) a predecessor to the athletic department, organized the sports available for women. Basketball was not one of the club sports offered until a student, Mary Neikirk, organized a petition which was presented to the administration. The school agreed to add basketball as a club sport under the auspices of the UTSA.

The first year's budget was $100. A team was formed, and the team played under the girl's rules of the era—six players on a team, two of whom stayed at the defensive end, two of whom stayed in the offensive end and two, called "rovers" who could play both ends. These rules were used until 1971, at which time they switched to "boy's rules".

In 1973, the team practiced and played in the annex of Gregory Gymnasium. Rodney Page, who had some experience as a women's basketball assistant coach, was a referee at one of the games. When the current coach of the team quit, Page was hired. The Texas team, in Pages' first year, compiled a record of 7–11.

The 1974 season was a season of transition, with a mixture of firsts and lasts. This year's team was the first to play their games in Gregory Gymnasium itself, rather than the annex. This was the first year the team had trainers, and it was the first year that the Longhorn Band and cheerleaders perform for the team. It was their last year under the auspices of the UTSA. It was the last year before the sport attained the status of a full varsity sport.

Title IX was passed in 1972, with a provision prohibiting discrimination on the basis of sex. At the time it was passed, it was unknown what impact it would have on sports, including whether it even applied to intercollegiate sports. Two years, later, in 1974, the issue wasn't yet settled, with the Tower Amendment specifically excluding revenue-producing sports, but shortly thereafter, the Tower Amendment was eliminated. It was becoming clear that universities would have to respond sooner or later, but Texas responded in 1974. Shortly after the conclusion of the 1974 basketball season, Stephen Spurr, the university president, announced that a women's athletic department would be started, complete with offices, staff and a budget of $50,000.

=== Rod Page years (1974–1976) ===
Some schools waited for the Department of Health, Education and Welfare to provide specific regulations covering Title IX. These regulations would not be published until 1975. In 1974, Texas began offering varsity sports opportunities to female students in seven sports. In some ways, the University of Texas program became the envy of women at other schools, but the initial progress was relative. Two-thirds of the male athletes at Texas were on scholarship, while only one in fifteen female students were on scholarship. There were 21 male coach positions, almost all full-time, but seven women's coaches who were all part-time.

In the team's debut year, 1974–75, the team improved on their prior year's record, put together their first winning season by and they won the Texas State Invitational. The team started out strong, winning their first five games, including an overtime win against Houston 63–62, before running into Baylor, who won easily 116–62. Some of the games were played as preliminaries to the men's games, but others were stand-alone games. They would also lose their next game to Southwest Texas, on a night when fundraiser was held, with an exhibition match between UT All-Stars and the All American Red Heads Team, a barnstorming team of female basketball players. The team earned an invitation to the Texas AIAW post season tournament, as a second seed behind Southwest Texas. The tournament schedule required five games in three days. The Texas team did well, except against Southwest Texas, ending up with 17 victories against 10 losses, five of which were to Southwest Texas. Despite a winning record, they failed to make the AIAW tournament.

The following season, Texas team would achieve even more. The basketball team added Retha Swindell, a 6' 2" rebounder with defensive skills. The school also hired Donna Lopiano, who started what would become a 17-year stint as women's athletic director. She "vowed to have every Longhorn women's team in the top 10 and at least one national title within five years". While the school was expressing a commitment to women's varsity sports, not everyone was supportive. The football coach, Darrell Royal, had told President Ford that "Title IX might be the death of big-time college football.". Despite that concern, she managed to convince him to support her during her interview. The team's first game was against Southwest Texas, the team that had defeated Texas five times in the previous season. This time, Texas would prevail 57–47 in a game held at their arena. The team lost three in a row as a result of sickness and injury, then responded with a twelve-game winning streak. The team would go on to a 21–7 season record and finish 1st in the Texas AIAW South Central Zone.

Under Rod Page, the team had improved materially, so it was a surprise that when the Longhorns completed their regular season and prepared for the post-season tournament, athletic director Lopiano announced he would not be continuing as coach of the team. The news came as a shock to Page and the team. The reason given was that the position was a head coach of basketball and volleyball—Page did not have volleyball experience. However, Lopiano had her eye on Jody Conradt, who she felt could lead the team to become a national contender.

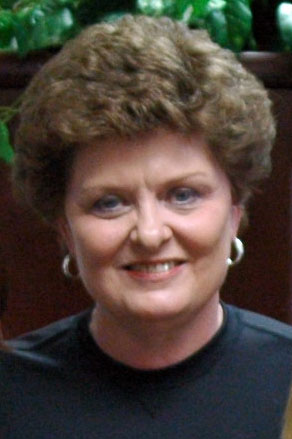
Jody Conradt, head coach from 1976 to 2007

=== Jody Conradt era (1976–2007) ===
==== Independent ====
Lopiano's choice was Jody Conradt, who was garnering national attention as the head coach at the University of Texas at Arlington. She turned a losing program around, and the 1975–76 team would compile a 23–11 record, despite materially strengthening their schedule of opponents at the same time. Two days after announcing that Page would not be returning, Lopiano announced that Conradt would be the coach starting with the next season. Conradt wasn't surprised that the team felt loyalty to Page, but she asked them to "have an open mind".

The first season under Conradt 1976-77 had a schedule of 46 games. The schedule included games in the Northeast, the first out-of-state trip for the team, and the first airplane ride for many of the players. To save money, the team stayed at the home of Lopiano's parents in Stamford, Connecticut. Texas lost badly to Queens College, then ranked No. 15 in the nation, but went on to the Penn State Invitational where they beat Penn State and Southern Connecticut, at that time a national power. Mel Greenberg, the organizer of the first top 25 women's poll, was in attendance. By the time the team returned to Austin, it learned of its first national ranking at No. 14. The team would complete its first season under Conradt with a record of 36–10 and make its first ever trip to the AIAW Regional Tournament.

In 1977–78, Texas went 29–10, finished first in the Texas AIAW S.C. Zone and went to the AIAW Regional Tournament again. They then made their first and only trip to the National Women's Invitational Tournament where they made it to the championship game and lost to Old Dominion to finish ranked #15 - their first end of season ranking in program history.

Conradt coached both basketball and volleyball her first two seasons, but would give up volleyball duties after the 1977–78 season. The team would go on to become a dominant women's basketball team on the 1980s, ranked in the AP Top 10 for all but one year between 1979 and 1990.

1978-79 was the program's best season up to that point. They won a then-school record 37 games and had their best ever winning percentage of 0.902. They went to the AIAW regional for the third time in a row, but despite finishing the season ranked at a best ever #4 in the AP Poll, they didn't go to the AIAW National Championship or the NWIT.

In the 1979–80 season, the Longhorns continued to improve, making their first ever appearance in the AIAW Tournament which was the national championship tournament until 1981. They would go again, in 1981 and 1982 (at which time it was an alternative to the NCAA Championship). Texas went 33-4 that season and finished ranked #7. In the post-season they finished 2nd to Stephen F. Austin in the Texas AIAW and lost to #9 Maryland in the 2nd Round of the AIAW Championship after beating #20 Mercer. Conradt received the AIAW National Coach of the Year award, the first of 4 National Coach of the year awards she would win.

In 1980–81, Texas went 28-8 and won its first Texas AIAW tournament championship in school history. It also won the first "Southwest Conference Tournament," a mid-season tournament in Houston made of Southwest Conference teams. It went back to the AIAW tournament and lost in the first round at home against Illinois State to finish the season ranked #16.

In 1981–82, Texas again won the "Southwest Conference Tournament" and the Texas AIAW as well as the AIAW Region 4 tournament. Most of the top teams went to the brand new NCAA Championship game in the postseason; but Texas, Rutgers and Villanova were the only top 20 teams to choose the AIAW tournament, which was held at the same time, instead. After beating Central Missouri State, Wisconsin and Wayland Baptist, Texas played in their first National Championship game where they lost to Rutgers 83-77 and finished the season ranked #5.

==== Southwest Conference ====
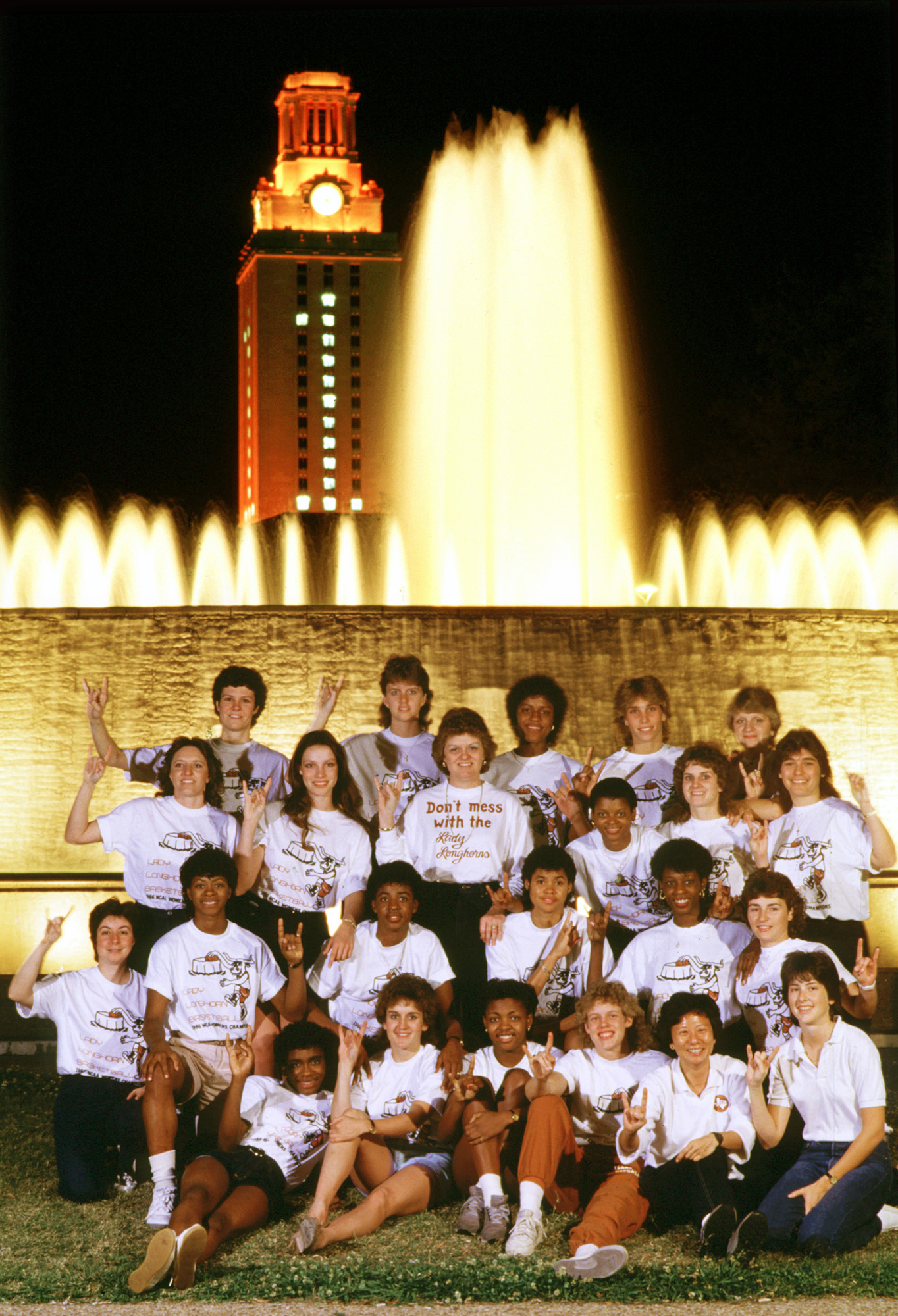
The Texas team, in front of the main tower, lit up with #1

By the time Southwest Conference play began in 1983, Texas was the conference's dominant team. They entered the tournament with an 8–0 conference record and a #3 ranking. They won the tournament with a combined margin of 101 points and earned the conference's automatic bid to the NCAA basketball tournament. They hosted their first game that year, a first round win over Louisville, and then advanced to the Regional Championship which they lost to #1 seed and eventual runner-up Louisiana Tech. For the season, Conradt was named conference and WBCA National Coach of the Year Award of the year, her first time winning either award and Annette Smith was named the Conference player of the year.

In 1984 and 1985 Texas again went undefeated in Southwest Conference play, won the conference tournament and went into the NCAA Tournament with the No. 1 ranking according in the AP poll, but failed to win the national championship in either year. In 1984, after going 30-2 and despite being the #1 ranked team they were a #2 seed in the tournament. They hosted Drake in the first round but after suffering knee injuries to five key players, including injuries to center Annette Smith so severe she was in rehabilitation for well over a year, they lost to Louisiana Tech in the Regional Championships on Tech's home court again. In 1985, they went 28–3, but were upset by a buzzer beating shot by Western Kentucky, and lost 92–90 in the Mideast Regional semifinals. Conradt again won conference coach of the year honors in each season while Smith was Conference Player of the Year in 1984 and Fran Harris was in 1985.

1986 would end differently. They started the season by winning the Texas Classic and the Orange Bowl Invitational pre-season tournaments. Then they again went undefeated in conference play, won the Southwest Conference championship and finished the season ranked #1, but instead of making an early exit, they went on to win every single game, achieving a record of 34–0 and won the National Championship. They posted the first undefeated season in women's basketball during the NCAA era (since 1982), the first in NCAA basketball since the 1975-76 Indiana Hoosiers and one of 10 undefeated season in women's college basketball overall as of 2025. Conradt won her 4th straight conference coach of the year award, and her second, and final, WBCA National Coach of the Year Award (her 3rd time winning National Coach of the Year). Meanwhile, for the 4th time in a row a Longhorn, Kamie Ethridge, was named as Conference Player of the Year. Ethridge was also an All-American (again) who won the Conference Female Athlete of the Year of the award, the Wade Trophy for best upperclass women's basketball player in the NCAA, the Honda Sports Award for the nation's best collegiate female basketball athlete and the Honda-Broderick Cup for Collegiate Woman Athlete of the Year (the only Longhorn to ever win the award).

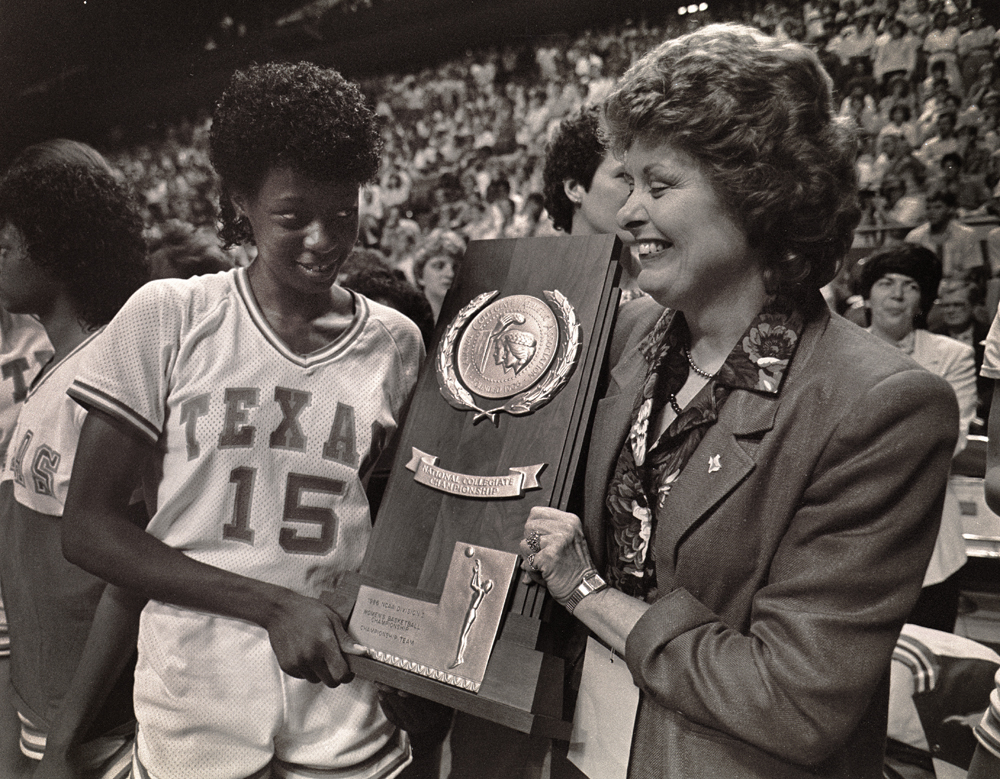
Annette Smith and Jody Conradt with the National Championship trophy

The 1986–87 season saw the previous year's NCAA Final Four MVP Clarissa Davis and 1988 Olympian Andrea Lloyd lead the team to their 5th straight undefeated Southwest Conference season and conference championship and then back to the Final Four, hosted in Austin. The Lady Longhorns fell in the national semifinals, 70–67, to nemesis Louisiana Tech. Conradt won Conference Coach of the year for the 5th time in a row, Lloyd was named conference Player of the Year and Davis was named the Naismith National Player of the Year.

Davis suffered a knee injury in the 1987–88 season, limiting her to action in just nine games, but behind the play of Southwest Conference Player of the Year Yulonda Wimbish the team rallied for another undefeated Southwest Conference championship season, SWC Tournament title, and No. 1 national seed in the NCAAs. Again, it was Louisiana Tech that ended the Longhorns' season — in Austin — with an 83–80 win in the Elite Eight.

Two recruiting arrivals in the fall of 1988 and fall of 1989 brought hopes that Texas would return to the Final Four: Catarina Pollini, a highly touted, 6-foot-5 European standout, and Vicki Hall, the Gatorade National Player of the Year, joining the program before the 1988–89 season. Pollini, a junior transfer, suffered a knee injury and missed 12 games in 1988–89 before returning to limited action. At that time, an obscure NCAA rule revealed that if she played past her March 16 birthday that season, it would be considered an additional year of eligibility. Opting to help Davis in her senior season, the team won the Southwest Conference Championship again and, as a #2 seed, reached the Elite Eight in the Austin Regional in 1989 where it fell to Maryland 79–71. Davis became the most decorated player in school history winning several National Player of the Year awards, including the Naismith Trophy, Wade Trophy and player of the year awards for the WBCA and USBWA and was named an All-American again.

In the fall of 1989, the state of Texas' top recruit in years, Sheryl Swoopes arrived on campus, only to leave due to homesickness before classes started. Swoopes would go on to lead Texas Tech to the 1993 NCAA Championship as Final Four MVP and Naismith College Player of the Year. As for Hall, she earned SWC Freshman of the Year honors in 1989–90 and was Texas' leading scorer the next season as Texas managed a 15-1 finish in Southwest Conference play—including a road loss to Arkansas that ended a streak of 132 conference wins. The Longhorns beat Texas Tech in the SWC Tournament championship game to win their 8th straight championship and, as a #3 seed, they again made it the Elite Eight where they lost to #1 seed Louisiana Tech in Austin 71–57.

In the 1990–91 season, Texas' dominance of the Southwest Conference came to an end. Texas lost two games during the season and finished 2nd in the regular season standings behind Arkansas. During the conference championship they failed to make the championship game after being upset by Swoopes and Texas Tech. Seeded #7 and playing at home, they were upset by Lamar in the first round of the 1991 NCAA tournament. It was their worst performance in the Southwest Conference and NCAA Tournament since both had begun.

Against Missouri State in the opening game of the 1991–92 season, Hall tore her left ACL. Texas finished 11–3 in conference play (Arkansas had departed for the SEC) and fell to Texas Tech in the SWC Tournament championship game. The Longhorns' opening game in the NCAA Tournament's round of 32, where they were a #4 seed, saw them fall to UCLA 72–71.

In the 1992–93 season Texas again finished 2nd in the SWC regular season and was runner up in the tournament, finishing behind eventual National Champion Texas Tech in both. They were a #3 seed in the NCAA Tournament, but for the 6th time in 11 years their tournament ended with a loss to Louisiana Tech, this time being upset by the #6 seed.

In 1993-94 the Longhorns finished in 3rd in the regular season, the first time they were not in the top 2 since Southwest Conference play started. But in the tournament they upset #2 seed Texas A&M and #1 seed Texas Tech to win the tournament. It was the Longhorns last Southwest Conference Championship. They were a #5 seed in the NCAA Tournament and lost to #4 Seton Hall in the 2nd Round.

The 1994–95 season was a low-point for Texas. It was the team's first ever season with a losing record. Texas went 12–16, the worst record by a Conradt-coached team ever, and failed to make it to a post-season tournament for the first time ever. They pulled off an upset of Texas A&M in the conference tournament, but then lost to #2 seed SMU in the semifinals.

the 1995–96 season, the last of the Southwest Conference, was a bounce back for Texas. They won the Southwest Conference's regular season title and were the #1 seed in the conference tournament, but they were upset by Texas A&M in the 2nd round. They lost to #4 seed Kansas in the 2nd round of the NCAA Tournament. Conradt was named Southwest Conference Coach of the year for a record 6th time.

==== Big 12 Conference ====
In 1996, Texas moved to the Big 12. In their first season in the Big 12 (1996–97), Texas finished the regular season as the conference runner-up and ranked #14 heading into the Big 12 Tournament where they were upset by 3rd seed Colorado. Texas hosted their first two-round games as the #3 Seed in the tournament, but made a 2nd round exit after being upset by 6th seed Notre Dame.

1997-98 was another down year for the Horns. They finished 7th in the Big 12, were upset by #10 seed A&M in the first round of the conference tournament and failed to make the post-season for only the 2nd time.

In 1998–99, Texas improved over the prior year, finishing 4th in the Big 12. But they were upset by 5th seed Nebraska in the 2nd round of the Big 12 Tournament and lost to Auburn in the 1st round of the NCAA Tournament.

1999-2000 was a mixed bag of a season powered by All-American Edwina Brown. They finished 6th in the Big 12, but after upsets of #3 seed Oklahoma and #2 seed Texas Tech they made it to the Conference Championship game where they lost to #1 seed Iowa State. Brown was named the tournament's Most Outstanding Player. But at the NCAA Championship they again made an early exit after an upset loss to St. Joseph's. Brown won the Wade Trophy as the best upperclass women's basketball player in NCAA Division 1, making Texas the second school to win three awards after Louisiana Tech.

In 2000–01, Texas continued to be in the middle of the conference. They finished 7th in the regular season, were eliminated by #2 seed Texas Tech in the 2nd round of the conference tournament and was upset by Saint Mary's in the first round of the NCAA tournament.

Texas finished the 2001–02 season ranked at #14 and in 5th place in the Big 12. They made a first-round exit from the conference tournament after being upset by 12th seed Kansas, but made a run in the NCAA Tournament where they lost to Duke in the Sweet 16. It was the Longhorns first trip to the Sweet 16 since 1990.

2002-03 represented the last, best year of Conradt's run. Behind the play of 3rd Team All-American Stacy Stephens, Texas won both its first Big 12 regular season Championship and its first Big 12 Conference Championship and finished the season ranked #5. They entered the NCAA Tournament as a #2 seed and upset #1 seed LSU to get to its first Final Four since 1987. They lost in the Final Four to eventual champion UConn in a close 71–69 loss that Texas led by as much as 9 at one point and as late as the last 2:02. Conradt was named Big 12 Coach of the year for the first time.

Conradt won her last conference coach of the year award for the 2003–2004 season which started with an upset victory over then #2 Duke at the tip-off classic. That year Texas, powered by Big 12 Conference Freshman of the Year Tiffany Jackson and 2nd Team All-American Stacy Stephens, tied for the regular season conference championship and was upset by Oklahoma in the Big 12 Conference Tournament championship. At the NCAA tournament, Texas was a #1 seed and Conradt led the team to the Sweet 16, where the Longhorns were upset by LSU, for the last time during her career.

Conradt's last NCAA tournament appearance came at the end of the 2004–2005 season. The Longhorns finished 2nd in the Big 12 regular season and were upset by Kansas State in the conference semifinals. In the tournament, the Longhorns were a #3 seed but were knocked out early by #6 Georgia.

In Conradt's penultimate season, the team suffered through only the 3rd losing season in school history. In 2005-06 they finished 8th in the Big 12 and ended the season by being upset by Iowa State in the opening round of the Big 12 Tournament.

In Conradt's final season, the team improved only slightly over their 2005-06 performance, despite having the #1 recruiting class in the country. The Longhorns finished with a winning record and in 7th place in the conference. They made it to the 2nd round of the conference tournament where they were beat by #2 seed Oklahoma. In the first-round game, Conradt recorded her 900th career win. A few days later, they were not invited to any of the post-season tournaments marking the first and only time in school history, that Texas sat out the post-season for 2 years in a row. A few days after the tournament selections were announced, Conradt retired from coaching and took a job as special assistant to the Women's Athletic Director.

=== Gail Goestenkors era (2007–2012) ===
Within a month of Conradt's retirement, the Longhorns hired Duke basketball coach Gail Goestenkors as the new head coach. She led the Longhorns to five straight NCAA tournaments, while also serving as Assistant Coach of the gold medal-winning Olympic basketball team, but quit in 2012 citing fatigue.

After a 22-13 debut season, she led the Longhorns to an upset of Baylor in the 2008 Big 12 Tournament before losing to Oklahoma State in the semi-finals and then in the 2nd Round of the NCAA Tournament to #1 seed UConn. The first round win over Minnesota was the only NCAA tournament win during her 5 years at Texas.

In 2008–09, Texas went 21-12 and finished ranked #25 in the AP Poll and 6th in the Big 12. They were beat by Iowa State in the 2nd Round of the Big 12 Tournament and then upset by #11 seed Mississippi State in the opening round of the NCAA Tournament.

The 2009–10 season was the best of the Goestenkors era. Texas tied for 4th in the Big 12 and finished the season ranked #17/#25. They made it to the 2nd Round of the Big 12 Tournament but were then upset by San Diego State, at home, in the first round of the NCAA Tournament.

Goestenkors final two seasons were practically carbon copies. In each year, Texas finished 7th in the Big 12, was a #9 seed in the NCAA tournament and lost in the first round. The only difference was in 2011 they won their first game in the Big 12 tournament to reach the quarterfinals.

Immediately after the 2012 season ended Goestenkors resigned, saying she was tired and needed to step away from basketball. She had two years left on her contract. She was 102–64 at Texas.

=== Karen Aston era (2012-2020) ===
The Karen Aston era at Texas seemed to get off to a good start when Texas beat #14 St. John's in their first game of the 2012–13 season, but it was all downhill from there. The Longhorns went on to post a 12–18 record, for the worst winning percentage in school history. They finished tied for 8th in the Big 12 and then lost to Kansas State in the first round of the conference tournament.

Texas greatly improved in the 2013–14 season. They won 22 games, finished 3rd in the conference and made it the conference tournament semi-finals where they lost to regular season conference runner-up West Virginia. They then advanced to the 2nd Round of the NCAA Tournament for the first time in 6 years, where they lost a close one to #4 seed Maryland.

The 2014-15 Longhorns again showed improvement over the prior year in what was arguably their best season in a decade. Winning 24 games they again finished 3rd in the conference but this time they pulled off an upset over #2 Oklahoma to advance to the Tournament Championship game where they lost to #1 seed Baylor. A #5 seed in the NCAA tournament, they survived a scare by Western Kentucky and then upset California to advance to the Sweet 16 for the first time since 2004. They lost to eventual national champion UConn and finished the season ranked #22.

Texas improved again in 2015-16 for their best season under coach Aston. They won 31 games, the most since 1987-88 and posted their best winning percentage since then as well. They came in 2nd in the Big 12 in the regular season, their best conference finish since 2004–05, and they were again the runner-up in the tournament to Baylor. After easy wins in the first two rounds of the NCAA tournament over Alabama State and Missouri, Texas had to mount a 10-point come-from behind victory over #3 Seed UCLA to get to the Elite 8 for the first time since 2002–03. In the Elite 8 they were beaten by eventual national champion UConn, for the 2nd year in a row, and finished the season ranked #7.

In 2016-17 the Longhorns won 25 games and again finished in 2nd place in the Big 12, but they did not get a rematch with Baylor as they were upset by eventual champion West Virginia in the Conference Tournament Semifinals. They made it the Sweet 16 for the 3rd year in a row, the first time they'd done that since the 2002-2004 stretch, but they couldn't get past #2 seed Stanford. They finished the season ranked #14 and Aston was named Big 12 Women's College Basketball Coach of the year and one of four finalists for the Naismith Women's College Coach of the Year award; and Brooke McCarty was named conference player of the year.

For the 3rd straight year, the Longhorns finished 2nd to Baylor in the Big 12 - this time after winning 28 games in 2017–18. This time they did meet Baylor in the Championship game, but again they came up short. They were a #2 seed in the NCAA Tournament but made an early exit after being upset by #3 seed UCLA. They finished the season ranked in the top 10 in both polls for the last time under Aston, who was one of ten semifinalists for the Naismith Women's College Coach of the Year award.

In 2018-19 the Longhorns finished 3rd in the Big 12. They lost to #2 seed Iowa State in the Conference Tournament semifinals and then made another early exit from the NCAA Tournament went they were upset by #10 seed Indiana in the first round. They finished the season ranked #22/#24.

The 2019–2020 season, shortened due to Covid, was Aston's last. Texas finished 3rd in the Conference regular season and failed to win 20 games for the first time since Aston's first season. A month after the season ended, Texas AD Chris Del Conte announced that Aston's contract would not be renewed. While she went 184–83 as the Longhorns' head coach and led Texas to 4 straight Sweet 16 appearances, her teams struggled against ranked teams, going 32–47; went 1–18 against Baylor and had several high-profile players leave.

=== Vic Schaefer Era (2020-Present) ===
Shortly after letting Aston go, Texas hired Vic Schaefer away from Mississippi State to fill the head coaching vacancy.

==== Big 12 Conference ====
In his first season as head coach, Texas finished 5th in the Big 12, winning just 21 games that season, but overachieved in the tournaments. In the Big 12 tournament they upset #4 seed Iowa State in overtime to advance to the semifinals where they, again, lost to Baylor. Due to Covid, the entire NCAA tournament was played in San Antonio, giving Texas a small home-court advantage which they utilized to beat Butler and then upset #3 seed UCLA and #2 seed Maryland. They advanced to the Elite 8 for the first time since 2016, but were sent home after being beaten easily by #1 seed South Carolina.

In 2021–22, the Longhorns finished 3rd in the Big 12 and returned to the Big 12 Tournament Championship game for the first time since 2018. After losing to Baylor the last three times they'd met in the championship game, Texas pulled off the upset of the #1 seed and won their first conference championship of any kind since 2004, their first conference tournament championship since 2003 and only their 2nd ever Big 12 conference tournament championship. They were a #2 seed in the NCAA tournament that year and, after advancing past Fairfiled, Utah and Ohio State, lost to #1 seed Stanford at the regional final. Texas kept it close - they were only down by 5 going into the 4th quarter - but couldn't close the gap. It was their first time making the back-to-back Elite 8 appearances since 1989–90. They finished the season ranked #6/#7, their highest ranking since 2003.

After 19 years of being also-rans, the Longhorns won a share of the Big 12 regular season championship in 2022–23, but then underperformed in tournament season. They were upset by #3 seed Iowa State in the Big 12 Tournament and were then upset by #5 seed Louisville in the 2nd round of the NCAA Tournament. Schaefer was named conference coach of the year for his first time at Texas.

For Texas' final season in the Big 12, 2023–24, the Longhorns won 33 games, the most since the undefeated 1985–86 season, but still did not finish first in the conference during the regular season. As a result of the temporary Big 12 Conference expansion to 14 teams, the tournament used a ladder system with Texas earning a double-bye because they finished in the top 4. They beat #7 seed Kansas and 16th ranked Kansas State to advance to the Championship game. #1 seed Oklahoma was upset, so Texas faced #4 seed Iowa State to win its 3rd and final Big 12 women's basketball tournament championship. Texas earned a #1 seed in the NCAA tournament for the first time since 2004 and advanced easily past Drexel, Alabama and Gonzaga before being upset by #3 seed NC State in the Regional Championship. They finished the season ranked #5/#7 and Madison Booker was named Big 12 Player of the Year, Big 12 Freshman of the Year and won the Cheryl Miller Award.

==== Southeastern Conference ====
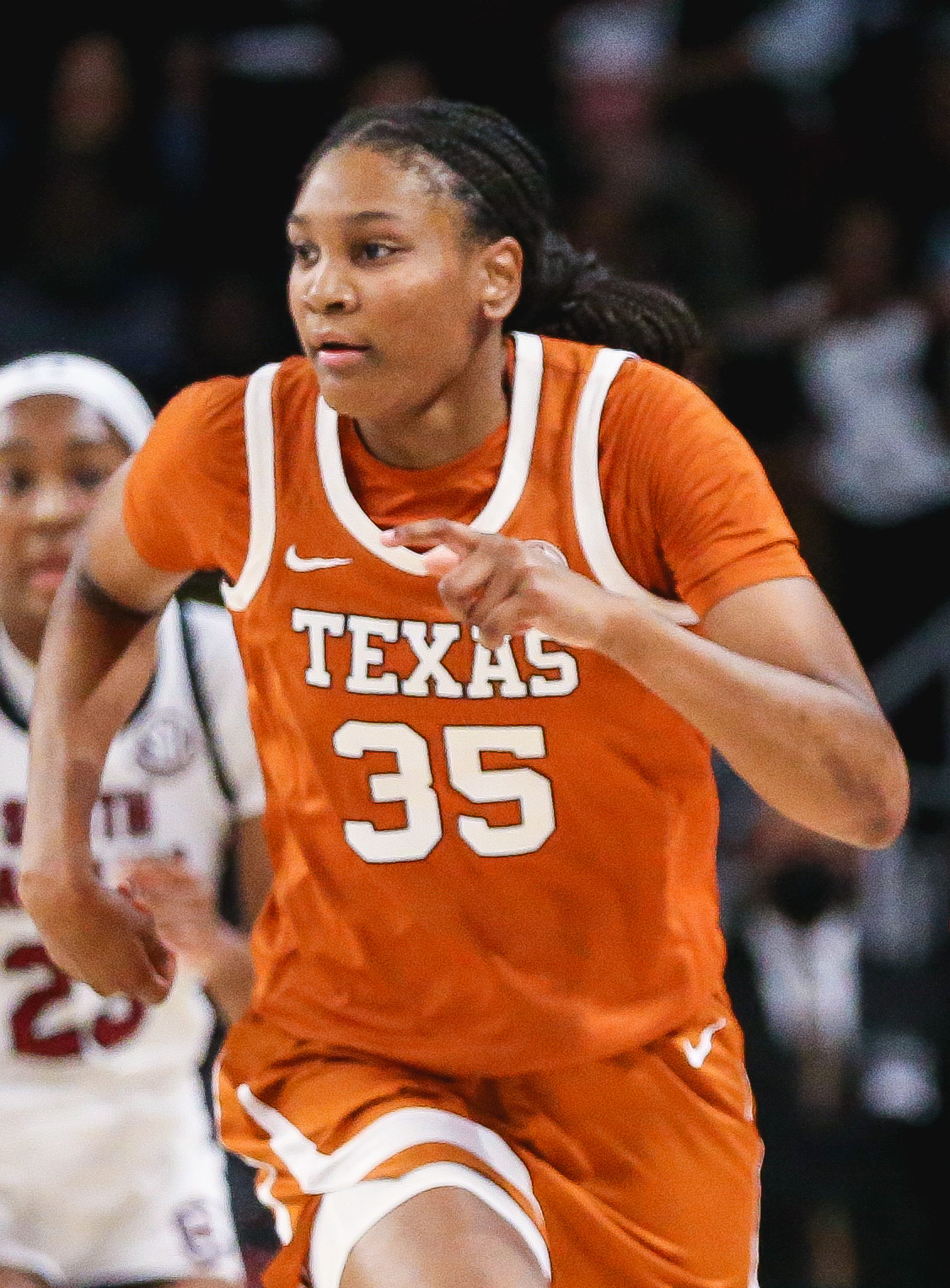
Madison Booker in 2025 game against South Carolina

The 2024–25 season was Texas' first in the SEC and they started it off by winning 35 games, tied for second most in school history and the most since 1981–82. Their record of 35-4 gave them an 89.7% winning percentage, the programs highest since 1987–88. They were the SEC regular season co-champion with #2 South Carolina, winning their 2nd conference regular season championship in 3 years. In their first SEC tournament, they were the #2 seed (after losing a coin toss) and after a double-bye they beat #7 seed Ole Miss and #3 seed LSU before losing to South Carolina 64–45 in the championship game. They were awarded a #1 seed in the NCAA tournament, making 2024-25 their first back-to-back #1 seed seasons since 1986–87. They beat William & Mary, Illinois, Tennessee, and TCU to earn their first Final Four trip since 2003. In the Final Four they had a rematch with South Carolina, but ultimately lost again (74–57). Booker was named the SEC Player of the year and won a 2nd Cheryl Miller Award. Vic Schaefer was named SEC Couch of the year.

In the 2025–26 season, Texas went 15–0 in non-conference play, and during this stretch, they won the Players Era Festival in November with wins over #3 UCLA and #2 South Carolina. They also beat #11 North Carolina at home in the ACC-SEC Challenge and #13 Baylor at a neutral site in Fort Worth in the Sprouts Farmers Market espnW Invitational. In SEC play, the Longhorns won their first 3 games before losing back-to-back road games at #12 LSU and #2 South Carolina. They went on a 5-game winning streak before losing to #5 Vanderbilt in Nashville. After this, they won the remainder of their regular season games to finish in a tie for second place in the conference. In the SEC tournament, they defeated South Carolina 78–61 to win the tournament. They were seeded 1st in the Fort Worth 3 regional and defeated 16-seed Missouri State 87–45 in the First Round and 8-seed Oregon 100–58 in the Second Round. In the Sweet Sixteen, they beat 5-seed Kentucky 76–54 and then defeated 2-seed Michigan 77–41 in the Elite Eight. They reached the Final Four for the second year in a row and faced fellow 1-seed UCLA; the Longhorns had given the Bruins their only loss of the year when they defeated UCLA 76–65 at the Players Era Festival back in November. This time, however, UCLA got revenge and defeated Texas 51–44 to advance to the National Championship Game (which the Bruins would win 79–51 over South Carolina). Madison Booker was held to 3-23 from the field and only scored 6 points. Late in the game, with Texas down 47–44, Booker attempted to drive to the rim and score, but her shot was blocked by UCLA's Lauren Betts. Texas finished the year 35–4 and they were ranked #4 in the final polls, the same ranking as in the previous season.

== Facilities ==
=== Gregory Gymnasium ===
Originally built in 1930, Gregory Gymnasium was named after its main advocate and planner, Thomas Watt Gregory. An alumnus of the university, Gregory served on the university's Board of Regents and as United States Attorney General (1914–19) before the gym was built. Gregory Gymnasium is located on the UT central campus, a short distance southeast of the UT Main Building, Tower, and Main Mall and facing west onto Speedway Avenue, the campus's central north–south street.

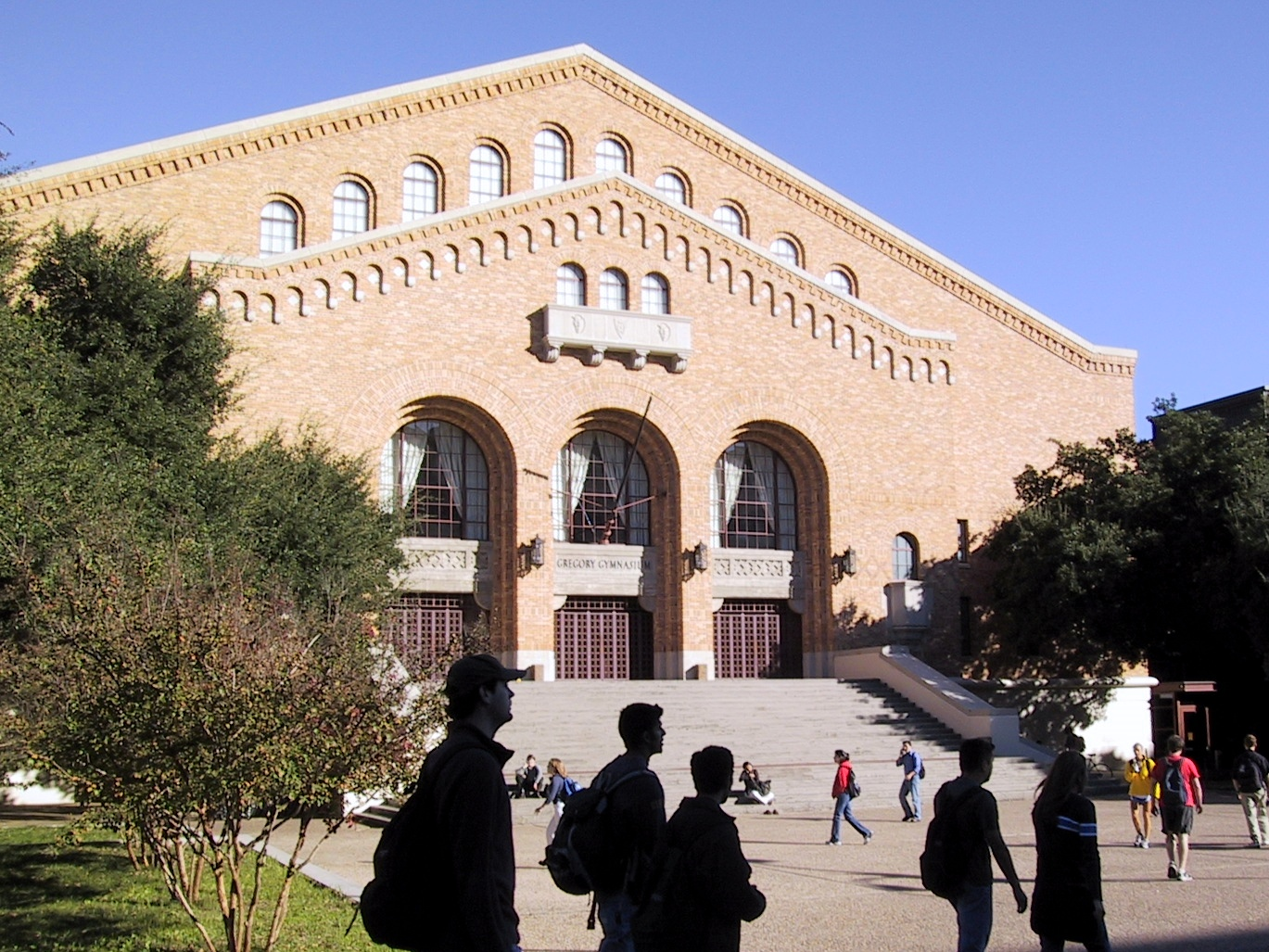
Front façade of Gregory Gymnasium

The Texas women's basketball team played home games in the Gregory Gymnasium annex in the 1972–73 season and then in the Gymnasium itself beginning with the 1973–74 season until moving into the Special Events Center (later renamed the Frank Erwin Center) for the 1977–78 season.

=== Frank Erwin Center ===
The Texas women's basketball team opened the Frank Erwin Center on November 29, 1977, with a 67–64 victory over Temple College.

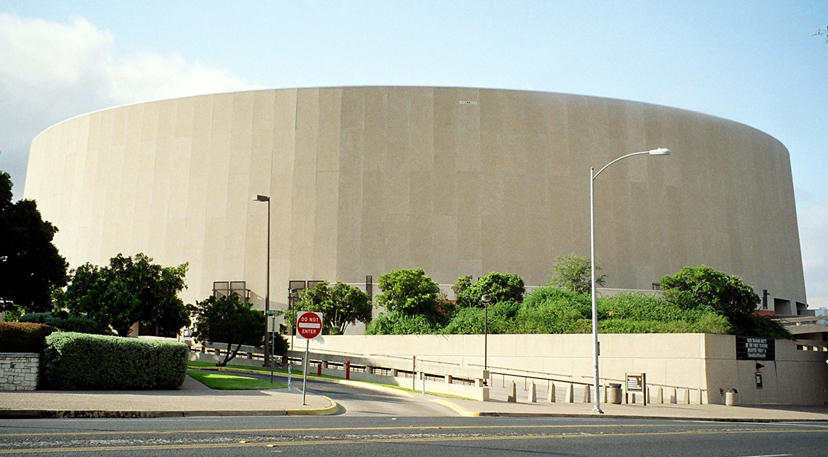
The Frank Erwin Center

Built for a total cost of $34 million, the building was named for former UT alumnus and Board of Regents member Frank Erwin. Originally known as the Special Events Center, the facility was renamed in 1981 to honor Erwin, who had died that year. The Erwin Center was located at the southeastern corner of the UT central campus and was bounded on the west by Red River Street on the east by Interstate 35.

A two-level layout (the lower arena and upper mezzanine) accommodated up to 16,540 spectators for basketball games. UT undertook extensive renovations of the facility from 2001 to 2003 at a cost of $55 million, adding, among other things, new and renovated seating, new video and sound systems, new lighting, and 28 suites. As part of the project, UT constructed the Denton A. Cooley Pavilion, a state-of-the-art practice and training facility that sits adjacent to the Erwin Center.

The master plan released in 2013 for the university's new Dell Medical School indicated that the Erwin Center would be demolished in a later phase of construction within 6–15 years. The final basketball season played there was 2021–22, with the Moody Center opening the following spring.

=== Denton A. Cooley Pavilion ===
Built during the final phase of the renovation of the Erwin Center, the Denton A. Cooley Pavilion opened in the fall of 2003. The two-level, 44,000-square-foot building sits adjacent to the Erwin Center and serves as a state-of-the-art practice and training facility for the Texas men's and women's basketball teams. The Pavilion is named for Dr. Denton A. Cooley, a UT alumnus, basketball letterman (1939–41), and pioneering heart surgeon.

The Texas men's and women's basketball teams have separate 9,000-square-foot practice court areas, each consisting of one full-court and one half-court practice area with seven basket stations. The practice facility also includes a locker room with a players' lounge, an instructional film theater, a 4,100-square-foot strength and conditioning area, an athletic training and hydrotherapy area, an academic resource and activity center, and a coaches' lounge and locker room.

The Cooley Pavilion will be demolished and replaced during the same phase of construction of the Dell Medical School as the Erwin Center.

=== Moody Center ===
The $388 million Moody Center is a multi-purpose arena on the campus of the University of Texas. The replacement to the Frank Erwin Center was built on a former parking lot located immediately south of Mike A. Myers Soccer Stadium. The arena seats 10,000+ for most basketball games and can expand to 15,000+ seats for large basketball games and other events.

== Roster ==
2026–27 Texas Longhorns women's basketball team
Players
Coaches

Pos.	#	Name	Height	Year	Previous school	Hometown
G	1	Bryanna Preston	5 ft 9 in (1.75 m)	Jr	Wesleyan	Jonesboro, GA
G	2	Amalia Holguin	5 ft 9 in (1.75 m)	Fr	Sage Hill	Newport Beach, CA
G	3	Brihanna Crittendon	6 ft 3 in (1.91 m)	Fr	Riverdale Ridge	Thornton, CO
G	4	Addison Bjorn	6 ft 1 in (1.85 m)	Fr	Park Hill South	Riverside, MO
G	8	Grace Prenter	5 ft 9 in (1.75 m)	So	Mount Anville	Dublin, Ireland
G	9	Zya Vann	5 ft 9 in (1.75 m)	Jr	Oklahoma	Edmond, OK
G	10	Aaliah Spaight	5 ft 7 in (1.7 m)	Fr	Bishop Gorman	Las Vegas, NV
F	14	Jada Bediako	6 ft 3 in (1.91 m)	Sr	Marquette	Toronto, CAN
C	16	Lovisa Asbrink Hose	6 ft 6 in (1.98 m)	Jr	Florida Atlantic	Stockholm, SE
G	21	Jayda Clark	6 ft 0 in (1.83 m)	So	Centre of Excellence	Perth, AUS
F	25	Breya Cunningham	6 ft 4 in (1.93 m)	Sr	Arizona	Chula Vista, CA
F	34	Joyce-Isi Etute	6 ft 2 in (1.88 m)	Fr	IMG Academy	Dudelange, Luxembourg
F	35	Madison Booker	6 ft 1 in (1.85 m)	Sr	Germantown	Ridgeland, MS

Head coach

- Vic Schaefer (Texas A&M)

Assistant coach(es)

- Elena Lovato (AHC) (Pittsburg State)
- Lindsay Wisdom-Hylton (Purdue)
- Blair Schaefer (Mississippi State)
- Victoria Vivians (Mississippi State)
- Mason Wright (Stephen F. Austin)

Legend

- (C) Team captain
- (S) Suspended
- (I) Ineligible
- (W) Walk-on
- Injured
- Current redshirt

Roster

== Year-by-year results ==
Season	Coach	Overall	Conference	Standing	Postseason	Coaches' poll	AP poll
Rod Page (Independent) (1974–1976)
1974–75	Rod Page	17–10	–		Texas AIAW		
1975–76	Rod Page	21–7	–		Texas AIAW		
Rod Page:		38–17 (.691)	–				
Jody Conradt (Independent) (1976–1982)
1976–77	Jody Conradt	36–10	–		AIAW Region 4 Tournament		
1977–78	Jody Conradt	29–10	–		NWIT Second Place		15
1978–79	Jody Conradt	37–4	–		AIAW Region 4 Tournament		4
1979–80	Jody Conradt	33–4	–		AIAW Sixteen (Play-in)		7
1980–81	Jody Conradt	28–8	–		AIAW First round		16
1981–82	Jody Conradt	35–4	–		AIAW Finals		5
Jody Conradt (Southwest Conference) (1982–1996)
1982–83	Jody Conradt	30–3	8–0	1st	NCAA Elite Eight		3
1983–84	Jody Conradt	32–3	16–0	1st	NCAA Elite Eight		1
1984–85	Jody Conradt	28–3	16–0	1st	NCAA Sweet Sixteen		1
1985–86	Jody Conradt	34–0	16–0	1st	NCAA Champions	1	1
1986–87	Jody Conradt	31–2	16–0	1st	NCAA Final Four	3	1
1987–88	Jody Conradt	32–3	16–0	1st	NCAA Elite Eight	5	4
1988–89	Jody Conradt	27–5	16–0	1st	NCAA Elite Eight	6	6
1989–90	Jody Conradt	27–5	15–1	T-1st	NCAA Elite Eight	6	8
1990–91	Jody Conradt	21–9	14–2	2nd	NCAA first round	25	16
1991–92	Jody Conradt	21–10	11–3	3rd	NCAA second round (bye)	23	19
1992–93	Jody Conradt	22–8	13–1	T-1st	NCAA second round (bye)	19	16
1993–94	Jody Conradt	22–9	10–4	3rd	NCAA second round	23	25
1994–95	Jody Conradt	12–16	7–7	T-4th			
1995–96	Jody Conradt	21–9	13–1	T-1st	NCAA second round	25	
Jody Conradt (Big 12) (1996–2007)
1996–97	Jody Conradt	22–8	12–4	T-2nd	NCAA second round	18	14
1997–98	Jody Conradt	12–15	7–9	7th			
1998–99	Jody Conradt	16–12	10–6	4th	NCAA first round		
1999–2000	Jody Conradt	21–13	9–7	6th	NCAA first round		
2000–01	Jody Conradt	20–13	7–9	7th	NCAA first round		
2001–02	Jody Conradt	22–10	10–6	5th	NCAA Sweet Sixteen	13	14
2002–03	Jody Conradt	29–6	15–1	1st	NCAA Final Four	3	5
2003–04	Jody Conradt	30–5	14–2	T-1st	NCAA Sweet Sixteen	10	4
2004–05	Jody Conradt	22–9	13–3	2nd	NCAA second round	17	13
2005–06	Jody Conradt	13–15	7–9	T-8th			
2006–07	Jody Conradt	18–14	6–10	T-7th			
Jody Conradt:		783–245 (.762)	SWC: 187–19 (.908); Big 12: 110–66 (.625)				
Gail Goestenkors (Big 12) (2007–2012)
2007–08	Gail Goestenkors	22–13	7–9	T-7th	NCAA second round		
2008–09	Gail Goestenkors	21–12	8–8	6th	NCAA first round		25
2009–10	Gail Goestenkors	22–11	10–6	T-4th	NCAA first round	25	17
2010–11	Gail Goestenkors	19–14	7–9	7th	NCAA first round		
2011–12	Gail Goestenkors	18–14	8–10	T-6th	NCAA first round		
Gail Goestenkors:		102–64 (.614)	40–42 (.488)				
Karen Aston (Big 12) (2012–2020)
2012–13	Karen Aston	12–18	5–13	T-8th			
2013–14	Karen Aston	22–12	11–7	3rd	NCAA second round		
2014–15	Karen Aston	24–11	9–9	T-3rd	NCAA Sweet Sixteen		22
2015–16	Karen Aston	31–5	15–3	2nd	NCAA Elite Eight	7	7
2016–17	Karen Aston	25–9	15–3	2nd	NCAA Sweet Sixteen	14	14
2017–18	Karen Aston	28–7	15–3	2nd	NCAA Sweet Sixteen	10	8
2018–19	Karen Aston	23–10	12–6	3rd	NCAA first round	23	
2019–20	Karen Aston	19–11	11–7	3rd			
Karen Aston:		184–83 (.689)	93–51 (.646)				
Vic Schaefer (Big 12) (2020–2024)
2020–21	Vic Schaefer	21–10	11–7	5th	NCAA Elite Eight	17	
2021–22	Vic Schaefer	29–7	13–5	3rd	NCAA Elite Eight	6	6
2022-23	Vic Schaefer	26–10	14–4	T–1st	NCAA Second round	19	15
2023-24	Vic Schaefer	33–5	14–4	2nd	NCAA Elite Eight	7	5
Vic Schaefer (SEC) (2024–present)
2024–25	Vic Schaefer	35–4	15–1	T–1st	NCAA Final Four		
2025–26	Vic Schaefer	35–4	13–3	T–2nd	NCAA Final Four		
2026–27	Vic Schaefer	0–0	0–0				
Vic Schaefer:		179–40 (.817)	80–24 (.769)				
Total:		1286–448 (.742)	SWC: 187–19 (.908); Big 12: 294–174 (.628); SEC: 28–4 (.875)				
National champion Postseason invitational champion Conference regular season champion Conference regular season and conference tournament champion Division regular season champion Division regular season and conference tournament champion Conference tournament champion

== Championships ==
National championships

National championships
Total	Type	Year
1	NCAA Division I Tournament champion	1986
1 national championship

Conference championships

Conference championships
Total	Type	Year
1	SEC championship (regular season)	2025*
3	Big 12 Conference championship (regular season)	2003, 2004*, 2023*
10	Southwest Conference championship (regular season)	1983, 1984, 1985, 1986, 1987, 1988, 1989, 1990*, 1993*, 1996*
3	Big 12 Conference tournament championship	2003, 2022, 2024
9	Southwest Conference tournament championship	1983, 1984, 1985, 1986, 1987, 1988, 1989, 1990, 1994
*Denotes shared conference championship
26 total conference championships

== Postseason ==
=== NCAA tournament results ===
Texas has appeared in the NCAA tournament on 38 occasions (tied for third-most appearances all time). The Longhorns' overall record in the tournament is 60–37.

Year	Seed	Round	Opponent	Results
1983	(2)	First round Sweet Sixteen; Elite Eight	(7) Louisville (3) Kansas State (1) Louisiana Tech	W 84–55; W 73–70; L 58–72
1984	(2)	First round Sweet Sixteen; Elite Eight	(7) Drake (6) Louisiana-Monroe (1) Louisiana Tech	W 96–60; W 99–91; L 60–85
1985	(1)	First round Sweet Sixteen	(8) Western Michigan (4) Western Kentucky	W 84–62; L 90–92
1986	(1)	Second round Sweet Sixteen; Elite Eight; Final Four; National Championship	(9) Missouri (4) Oklahoma (2) Mississippi (4) Western Kentucky (1) Southern California	W 108–67; W 85–59; W 66–63; W 90–65; W 97–81
1987	(1)	Second round Sweet Sixteen; Elite Eight; Final Four	(9) St. Joseph's (4) James Madison (2) Rutgers (1) Louisiana Tech	W 86–56; W 91–57; W 85–77; L 75–79
1988	(1)	Second round Sweet Sixteen; Elite Eight	(8) South Carolina (5) Stanford (2) Louisiana Tech	W 77–58; W 79–58; L 80–83^{OT}
1989	(2)	Second round Sweet Sixteen; Elite Eight	(7) Montana (6) UNLV (1) Maryland	W 83–54; W 88–77; L 71–79
1990	(3)	Second round Sweet Sixteen; Elite Eight	(6) Ohio State (2) North Carolina State (1) Louisiana Tech	W 95–66; W 72–63; L 57–71
1991	(7)	First round	(10) Lamar	L 63–77
1992	(4)	Second round	(5) UCLA	L 81–82
1993	(3)	First round	(6) Louisiana Tech	L 78–82
1994	(5)	First round Second round	(12) Oklahoma State (4) Seton Hall	W 75–67; L 66–71
1996	(5)	First round Second round	(12) Missouri State (4) Kansas	W 73–55; L 70–77
1997	(3)	First round Second round	(14) Texas State (6) Notre Dame	W 66–38; L 83–86
1999	(12)	First round	(5) Auburn	L 61–69
2000	(7)	First round	(10) St. Joseph's	L 48–69
2001	(8)	First round	(9) St. Mary's (CA)	L 64–68
2002	(4)	First round Second round Sweet Sixteen	(13) Wisconsin–Green Bay (12) UC Santa Barbara (1) Duke	W 60–55; W 76–60; L 46–62
2003	(2)	First round Second round Sweet Sixteen; Elite Eight; Final Four	(15) Hampton (7) Arkansas (6) Minnesota (1) LSU (1) Connecticut	W 90–46; W 67–50; W 73–60; W 78–60; L 69–71
2004	(1)	First round Second round Sweet Sixteen	(16) Southern (8) Michigan State (4) LSU	W 92–57; W 80–61; L 55–71

Year	Seed	Round	Opponent	Results
2005	(3)	First round Second round	(14) Oral Roberts (6) Georgia	W 64–47; L 68–70
2008	(8)	First round Second round	(9) Minnesota (1) Connecticut	W 72–55; L 55–89
2009	(6)	First round	(11) Mississippi State	L 63–71
2010	(6)	First round	(11) San Diego State	L 63–74
2011	(9)	First round	(8) Marquette	L 65–68
2012	(9)	First round	(8) West Virginia	L 55–68
2014	(5)	First round Second round	(12) Penn (4) Maryland	W 71–68; L 64–69
2015	(5)	First round Second round Sweet Sixteen	(12) Western Kentucky (4) California (1) Connecticut	W 66–64; W 73–70; L 54–105
2016	(2)	First round Second round Sweet Sixteen; Elite Eight	(15) Alabama State (10) Missouri (3) UCLA (1) Connecticut	W 86–42; W 73–55; W 72–64; L 65–86
2017	(3)	First round Second round Sweet Sixteen	(14) Central Arkansas (6) North Carolina State (2) Stanford	W 78–50; W 84–80; L 66–77
2018	(2)	First round Second round Sweet Sixteen	(15) Maine (7) Arizona State (3) UCLA	W 83–54; W 85–65; L 75–84
2019	(7)	First round	(10) Indiana	L 65–69
2021	(6)	First round Second round Sweet Sixteen; Elite Eight	(11) Bradley (3) UCLA (2) Maryland (1) South Carolina	W 81–62; W 71–62; W 64–61; L 34–62
2022	(2)	First round Second round Sweet Sixteen; Elite Eight	(15) Fairfield (7) Utah (6) Ohio State (1) Stanford	W 70–52; W 78–56; W 66–63; L 50–59
2023	(4)	First round Second round	(13) East Carolina (5) Louisville	W 79–40; L 51–73
2024	(1)	First round Second round Sweet Sixteen; Elite Eight	(16) Drexel (8) Alabama (4) Gonzaga (3) NC State	W 82–42; W 65–54; W 69–47; L 66–76
2025	(1)	First round Second round Sweet Sixteen; Elite Eight; Final Four	(16) William & Mary (8) Illinois (5) Tennessee (2) TCU (1) South Carolina	W 105–61; W 65–48; W 67–59; W 58–47; L 57–74
2026	(1)	First round Second round Sweet Sixteen; Elite Eight; Final Four	(16) Missouri State (8) Oregon (5) Kentucky (2) Michigan (1) UCLA	W 87–45; W 100–58; W 76–54; W 77–41; L 44–51

=== NCAA tournament seeding history ===
The NCAA has seeded the Tournament since its inaugural year in 1982. Texas participated in the final AIAW women's basketball tournament in 1982 rather than the inaugural NCAA Tournament (falling in the AIAW Championship Game to Rutgers, 83–77); the Longhorns began participating in the NCAA Tournament in 1983. Texas has appeared in 37 of the 42 Tournaments held since 1983.

Years →	'83	'84	'85	'86	'87	'88	'89	'90	'91	'92	'93	'94	'96	'97	'99	'00	'01	'02	'03	'04	'05	'08	'09	'10	'11	'12	'14	'15	'16	'17	'18	'19	'21	'22	'23	'24	'25	'26
Seeds →	2	2	1	1	1	1	2	3	7	4	3	5	5	3	12	7	8	4	2	1	3	8	6	6	9	9	5	5	2	3	2	7	6	2	4	1	1	1

=== AIAW Division I ===
The Longhorns made three appearances in the AIAW National Division I basketball tournament, with a combined record of 6–3.

Year	Round	Opponent	Result
1980	First round Second round	Mercer; Maryland	W, 81–60; L, 63–68
1981	First round	Illinois State	L, 63–66
1982	First round Quarterfinals; Semifinals; National Championship	Central Missouri State; Wisconsin; Wayland Baptist; Rutgers	W, 67–54; W, 73–61; W, 82–63; L, 77–83

== AP and Coaches polls ==
Texas has been ranked in at least one of the final AP or Coaches polls in 28 seasons since their introduction prior to the 1976–77 and 1985–86 seasons, respectively. The Longhorns have recorded 16 Top 10 finishes and 10 Top Five finishes in one or more of the final polls. As of March 2, 2017, Texas teams have been ranked in 587 of 822 total weekly AP polls (71.4%) since the inception of the poll in the 1976–77 season (third all-time in AP poll appearances), and in 445 of 687 total weekly Coaches polls (64.8%) since the inception of the poll in the 1985–86 season.

Texas in the AP poll (1977–present)
Season	Preseason ranking	Peak ranking	Weeks ranked	Final AP poll
1976–77	14	13	5/10	—
1977–78	20	9	14/14	15
1978–79	11	2	17/17	4
1979–80	7	1	17/17	7
1980–81	8	6	18/18	16
1981–82	17	5	14/18	5
1982–83	5	3	17/17	3
1983–84	4	1	17/17	1
1984–85	2	1	17/17	1
1985–86	1	1	16/16	1
1986–87	1	1	16/16	1
1987–88	2	1	17/17	4
1988–89	3	3	17/17	6
1989–90	5	4	17/17	8
1990–91	7	7	17/17	16
1991–92	12	10	13/18	19
1992–93	10	10	16/16	16
1994–95	20	19	2/18	—
1995–96	—	24	2/18	—
1996–97	19	8	18/18	14
1997–98	23	23	2/18	—
1999–00	—	25	3/19	—
2000–01	—	12	11/19	—
2001–02	—	12	16/18	14
2002–03	11	5	19/19	5
2003–04	3	1	19/19	4
2004–05	2	2	18/18	13
2005–06	12	12	8/18	—
2006–07	25	22	9/19	—
2007–08	22	15	12/20	—
2008–09	13	4	19/19	25
2009–10	10	10	19/19	17
2010–11	17	16	8/19	—
2011–12	—	21	7/19	—
2012–13	—	12	7/20	—
2014–15	9	3	13/19	—
2015–16	12	4	19/19	7
2016–17	8	8	17/17	14
2017–18	2	2	17/17	8
2018–19	11	10	20/20	22
2019–20	15	15	4/20	—
2020–21	—	17	7/17	—
2021–22	25	6	19/19	6
2022–23	3	3	12/18	15
2023–24	13	4	19/19	4
2024–25	4		0/19	

Texas in the Coaches poll (1986–present)
Season	Preseason ranking	Peak ranking	Weeks ranked	Final Coaches poll
1985–86	1	1	17/17	1
1986–87	1	1	17/17	3
1987–88	2	1	18/18	5
1988–89	4	4	17/17	6
1989–90	5	4	18/18	6
1990–91	7	7	18/18	25
1991–92	12	12	12/18	23
1992–93	9	9	17/17	19
1993–94	25	23	2/18	23
1994–95	19	19	1/18	—
1995–96	—	25	1/19	25
1996–97	20	10	19/19	18
1997–98	24	24	1/17	—
2000–01	—	15	13/18	—
2001–02	—	12	17/20	13
2002–03	11	3	19/19	3
2003–04	3	2	21/21	10
2004–05	3	3	18/18	17
2005–06	12	12	8/19	—
2006–07	—	22	5/19	—
2007–08	22	15	11/19	—
2008–09	13	4	18/19	—
2009–10	13	13	19/19	25
2010–11	20	19	6/19	—
2011–12	20	20	9/20	—
2012–13	24	16	7/21	—
2014–15	12	3	17/20	22
2015–16	11	4	20/20	7
2016–17	6	6	17/17	—
2017–18	6	4	19/19	10
2018–19	8	8	18/20	—
2019–20	15	—	1/19	—
2020–21	—	17	8/17	17
2021–22	21	7	19/19	7
2022–23	3	3	13/20	19
2023–24	14	3	20/20	5
2024–25			0/20	

== All-time series records ==
=== All-time series records against SEC members ===
Texas vs.	Overall record	at Austin	at Opponent's Venue	at neutral site	Last 5 meetings	Last 10 meetings	Current streak	Since Beginning of SEC
Alabama	4–0	2–0	0–0	3–0	4–0	3–0	W 4	1–0
Arkansas	23–3	9–2	7–1	7–0	3–2	7–3	W 3	1–0
Auburn	1–1	0–0	1–0	0–1	1–1	1–1	W 1	1–0
Florida	2–3	2–1	0–2	0–0	2–3	2–3	W 1	1–0
Georgia	4–5	0–2	3–2	1–1	3–2	4–5	W 2	1–0
Kentucky	3–0	0–0	1–0	2–0	3–0	3–0	W 3	1–0
LSU	6–4	3–0	1–2	2–2	3–2	6–4	W 2	1–0
Mississippi State	3–4	1–1	1–1	1–2	3–2	3–4	L 1	1–0
Missouri	24–2	13–0	7–2	4–0	5–0	9–1	W 5	1–0
Oklahoma	40–29	21–11	14–16	5–2	3–2	6–4	W 1	1–0
Ole Miss	8–1	3–0	2–1	3–0	4–1	8–1	W 4	2–0
South Carolina	3–3	2–1	0–1	1–1	2–3	3–3	W 1	1–1
Tennessee	18–26	9–11	6–13	2–2	2–3	5–5	W 2	2–0
Texas A&M	64–24	29–8	26–11	9–5	4–1	6–4	W 2	1–0
Vanderbilt	2–4	2–2	0–2	0–0	1–4	2–4	W 1	1–0
*As of March 2, 2025.

=== All-time series records against former Big 12 members ===
Texas women's basketball leads the all-time series against all former Big 12 Conference opponents. Texas holds a winning record against all former Big 12 members in games played in Big 12 competition.

Texas vs. former Big 12 members^{*}
Texas vs.	Overall record	at Austin	at Opponent's Venue	at neutral site	Last 5 meetings	Last 10 meetings	Current streak	During Membership in Big 12	Last meeting
Baylor	61–50	26–21	27–23	8–6	3–2	3–7	W 1	22–44	2024
Colorado	16–4	7–1	7–2	2–1	5–0	9–1	W 3	13–4	2011
Iowa State	28–23	14–7	9–11	5–5	3–2	8–2	W 2	29–24	2024
Kansas	36–12	17–5	14–7	5–0	5–0	8–2	W 5	34–11	2024
Kansas State	33–18	17–5	12–10	4–3	4–1	9–1	W 2	29–18	2024
Nebraska	14–6	8–1	tied, 4–4	2–1	2–3	7–3	W 1	13–5	2011
Oklahoma State	44–17	24–4	16–12	4–1	4–1	8–2	W 3	41–18	2024
Texas Christian	53–4	25–1	25–3	3–0	5–0	9–1	W 9	21–4	2024
Texas Tech	80–32	39–8	28–19	13–5	4–1	7–3	W 3	32–25	2024
West Virginia	19–10	9–2	7–5	3–3	5–0	7–3	W 6	18–12	2024
*As of December 7, 2024.

=== All-time series records against non-Big 12 former SWC members ===
Texas leads all series against former Southwest Conference members who are not current members of the Big 12.

Texas vs. former SWC opponents (non-Big 12)^{*}
Texas vs.	Overall record	at Austin	at Opponent's Venue	at neutral site	Last 5 meetings	Last 10 meetings	Current streak	Since End of SWC	Last meeting
Houston	UT, 54–3	UT, 23–0	UT, 21–3	UT, 10–0	UT, 4–1	UT, 8–2	W 1	tied, 1–1	1999-12-07
Rice	UT, 34–1	UT, 15–0	UT, 16–1	UT, 3–0	UT, 4–1	UT, 9–1	W 2	UT, 2–0	2015-11-21
Southern Methodist	UT, 36–3	UT, 16–1	UT, 15–1	UT, 5–1	UT, 4–1	UT, 7–3	W 4	UT, 2–0	2020-11-05
*As of end of 2021–22 season.

== Individual honors, awards, and accomplishments ==
=== Retired numbers ===
The Longhorns retired their first number in program history on September 7, 2019. Kamie Ethridge’s number 33 was officially retired at halftime of a Texas–LSU football game, becoming the first female Longhorn athlete to receive this honor.

Clarissa Davis's number 24 was retired on March 8, 2020, at a pre-game ceremony during the Texas-Oklahoma State Women's Basketball game.

Texas Longhorns retired numbers
No.	Player	Seasons	Year retired
33	Kamie Ethridge	1983-1986	2019
24	Clarissa Davis	1986-1989	2020

=== Honors, awards, and accomplishments by player ===
The individual honors, awards, and accomplishments listed in the succeeding subsections are aggregated by player in the following table. Players with only all-conference honors (other than conference player of the year) or lower than first-team All-America honors are not included.

Name	Position	Seasons	Notes
Madison Booker	F	2023–present	Cheryl Miller Award (2024, 2025); SEC Player of the year (2025); Big 12 Player of the Year (2024); Big 12 Freshman of the Year (2024); Big 12 tournament most outstanding player (2024) first-team All-SEC (2025) first-team All-Big 12 (2024)
Charli Collier	F	2018–21	2021 WNBA All-Rookie Team; 2021 WNBA draft 1st Round, 1st pick—Dallas Wings; Two-time first-team All-Big 12 forward (2020–21); 2021 Big 12 All-defensive team
Sug Sutton	G	2017–present	2020 WNBA draft 3rd Round, 36th pick—Washington Mystics; 2020 second-team All-Big 12; 2019 Big 12 All-tournament team 2019 first-team All-Big 12 guard
Ariel Atkins	G	2015–present	2-time WNBA All-Star (2021,22); 2022 first WNBA All-Defensive Team; 4-time second WNBA All-Defensive Team (2018–21); 2018 WNBA All-Rookie Team; 2018 WNBA draft 1st Round, 7th pick—Washington Mystics; Two-time first-team All-Big 12 guard (2017–18)
Imani Boyette	C	2013–16	2016 WNBA All-Rookie Team; 2016 WNBA draft 1st Round, 10th pick—Chicago Sky; 2016 Big 12 Conference Defensive Player of the Year; Two-time first-team All-Big 12 center (2015–16); 2013 Big 12 Conference Freshman of the Year
Edwina Brown	F	1997–2000	2000 WNBA draft 1st Round, 3rd pick—Detroit Shock; 2000 National Player of the Year (Wade Trophy); 2000 first-team All-American forward 1999 second-team All-American forward Two-time first-team All-Big 12 forward (1999–2000)
Edna Campbell	G	1990–91	1999 WNBA draft 1st Round, 10th pick—Phoenix Mercury; Two-time first-team All-SWC guard (1990–91)
Jamie Carey	PG	2003–05	2005 WNBA draft 3rd Round, 5th pick (31st overall)—Phoenix Mercury; Two-time first-team All-Big 12 guard (2004–05)
Clarissa Davis	F	1986–89	Women's Basketball Hall of Fame member (2006); 1999 WNBA draft 2nd Round, 10th pick (22nd overall)—Phoenix Mercury; 1992 Olympic bronze medalist 1989 National Player of the Year (Naismith Trophy, Wade Trophy, USBWA, WBCA); 1987 National Player of the Year (Naismith Trophy); Two-time first-team All-American forward (1987, 1989); 1989 Southwest Conference Player of the Year; Three-time first-team All-SWC forward (1986–87, 1989); 1986 Southwest Conference Freshman of the Year
Nneka Enemkpali	F	2012–15	2015 WNBA draft 3rd Round, 2nd pick (26th overall)—Seattle Storm; 2014 first-team All-Big 12 forward
Kamie Ethridge	PG	1983–86	Women's Basketball Hall of Fame member (2002); 1988 Olympic gold medalist 1986 Honda Cup for Collegiate Woman Athlete of the Year; 1986 National Player of the Year (Wade Trophy, Honda Sports Award); Frances Pomeroy Naismith Award for the top senior woman who is 5 ft 8 in (1.73 m) or shorter Two-time first-team All-American guard (1985–86); 1986 Southwest Conference Female Athlete of the year 1986 Southwest Conference Player of the year Three-time first-team All-SWC guard (1984–86)
Fran Harris	G	1983–86	1985 Southwest Conference Player of the Year; Three-time first-team All-SWC guard (1984–86)
Tiffany Jackson	F	2004–07	2007 WNBA draft 1st round, 5th pick—New York Liberty; 2005 first-team All-American forward Three-time first-team All-Big 12 forward (2005–07); 2004 Big 12 Conference Freshman of the Year
Andrea Lloyd	F	1984–87	Women's Basketball Hall of Fame member (2007); 1999 WNBA draft 3rd round, 7th pick (31st overall)—Minnesota Lynx; 1988 Olympic gold medalist Three-time first-team All-American forward (1985–87); 1987 Southwest Conference Player of the Year; Four-time first-team All-SWC forward (1984–87); 1984 Southwest Conference Freshman of the Year
Brooke McCarty	PG	2015–18	2018 third-team All-American guard Three-time first-team All-Big 12 guard (2016–18); 2017 Big 12 Conference Player of the Year
Heather Schreiber	F	2002–05	2005 WNBA draft 3rd Round, 13th pick (39th overall)—Los Angeles Sparks; Two-time first-team All-Big 12 forward (2003–04); 2002 Big 12 Conference Freshman of the Year
Annette Smith	F	1982–84, 1986	Women's Basketball Hall of Fame member (2013); 1984 first-team All-American forward Two-time Southwest Conference Player of the Year (1983–84); Two-time first-team All-SWC forward (1983–84)
Stacy Stephens	F	2001–04	2004 WNBA draft 3rd Round, 11 pick (37th overall)—Houston Comets; 2004 second-team All-American forward 2003 third-team All-American forward Two-time first-team All-Big 12 forward (2003–04)
Beverly Williams	G	1985–88	1988 first-team All-American guard Two-time first-team All-SWC guard (1987–88)
Yulonda Wimbish	SG/SF	1985–88	1988 Southwest Conference Player of the Year; 1988 first-team All-SWC guard/forward

=== Women's Basketball Hall of Fame ===
Four Longhorn women's basketball players have been inducted into the Women's Basketball Hall of Fame in Knoxville, Tennessee.

Longhorns in the Women's Basketball Hall of Fame
Player	No.	Position	UT Career	Date inducted
Kamie Ethridge	33	PG	1983–86	April 27, 2002
Clarissa Davis	24	F	1986–89	April 29, 2006
Andrea Lloyd	25	F	1984–87	June 9, 2007
Annette Smith	15	F	1982–84, 1986	June 8, 2013

=== National honors and awards (players) ===
==== National Player of the Year ====
Three Texas players have won one or more of the widely recognized National Player of the Year awards on four occasions.

National Player of the Year award recipients
Player	No.	Position	Career	Award Year	Awards
Kamie Ethridge	33	PG	1983–86	1986	Wade Trophy; Honda Sports Award; Frances Pomeroy Naismith Award
Clarissa Davis	24	F	1986–89	1987	Naismith College Player of the Year
Clarissa Davis	24	F	1986–89	1989	Naismith College Player of the Year; Wade Trophy; USBWA Women's National Player of the Year; WBCA Player of the Year
Edwina Brown	24	F	1997–2000	2000	Wade Trophy

==== All-America honors ====
Eleven Texas basketball players have received All-America honors on 19 occasions. Seven Texas players have received first-team All-America honors in 11 seasons, with two Longhorn players having been selected as a first-team All-American twice and one player having been selected three times.

First-team All-Americans
First-team All-Americans by year
Year	Player	No.	Position	Career
1984	Annette Smith	15	F	1982–84, 1986
1985	Kamie Ethridge	33	PG	1983–86
1985	Andrea Lloyd	25	F	1984–87
1986	Andrea Lloyd	25	F	1984–87
1986	Kamie Ethridge	33	PG	1983–86
1987	Clarissa Davis	24	F	1986–89
1987	Andrea Lloyd	25	F	1984–87
1988	Beverly Williams	10	G	1985–88
1989	Clarissa Davis	24	F	1986–89
2000	Edwina Brown	24	F	1997–2000
2005	Tiffany Jackson	33	F	2004–07
2025	Madison Booker	35	F	2023–present

All-Americans (any selection)
All-American selections by year
Year	Player	No.	Position	Career
1978	Retha Swindell	44	C	1976–79
1978	Linda Waggoner	20	G	1977–80
1979	Linda Waggoner	24	G	1977–80
1980	Linda Waggoner	24	G	1977–80
1984	Annette Smith	15	F	1982–84, 1986
1985	Kamie Ethridge	33	PG	1983–86
1985	Andrea Lloyd	25	F	1984–87
1986	Kamie Ethridge	33	PG	1983–86
1986	Andrea Lloyd	25	F	1984–87
1987	Clarissa Davis	24	F	1986–89
1987	Andrea Lloyd	25	F	1984–87
1988	Beverly Williams	10	G	1985–88
1989	Clarissa Davis	24	F	1986–89
1999	Edwina Brown	24	F	1997–2000
2000	Edwina Brown	24	F	1997–2000
2003	Stacy Stephens	41	F	2001–04
2004	Stacy Stephens	41	F	2001–04
2005	Tiffany Jackson	33	F	2004–07
2018	Brooke McCarty	11	G	2015–18
2021	Charli Collier	35	C	2018–21
2022	Rori Harmon	3	G	2021–present
2023	Rori Harmon	3	G	2021–present
2024	Madison Booker	35	F	2023–present
2025	Madison Booker	35	F	2023–present

=== Conference honors and awards (players) ===
==== Conference Player of the Year ====
Five Texas players have won conference player of the year honors on six occasions—all in the Southwest Conference. One Longhorn player has won Big 12 Player of the Year honors, and two players have won Big 12 Defensive Player of the Year honors.

SEC Player of the Year
SEC Player of the Year
Year	Player	No.	Position	Career
2025	Madison Booker	35	F	2023–present

Southwest Conference Player of the Year
Southwest Conference Player of the Year
Year	Player	No.	Position	Career
1983	Annette Smith	15	F	1982–84, 1986
1984	Annette Smith	15	F	1982–84, 1986
1985	Fran Harris	20	G	1983–86
1987	Andrea Lloyd	25	F	1984–87
1988	Yulonda Wimbish	34	G/F	1985–88
1989	Clarissa Davis	24	F	1986–89

Big 12 Player of the Year
Big 12 Player of the Year
Year	Player	No.	Position	Career
2017	Brooke McCarty	11	PG	2014–18
2024	Madison Booker	35	F	2023–present

Big 12 Defensive Player of the Year
Big 12 Defensive Player of the Year
Year	Player	No.	Position	Career
2016	Imani Boyette	34	C	2013–16
2017	Brianna Taylor	20	G	2013–17
2023	Rori Harmon	3	G	2021–present

Big 12 Newcomer of the Year
Big 12 Newcomer of the Year
Year	Player	No.	Position	Career
2003	Jamie Carey	11	G	2002–05
2017	Shaylee Gonzales	2	G	2022–present

Big 12 Sixth Player of the Year
Big 12 Sixth Player of the Year
Year	Player	No.	Position	Career
2024	DeYona Gaston	5	F	2020–2024

==== First-team all-conference honors ====
Twenty-five Texas women's basketball players have received first-team all-conference honors on 48 occasions. Of these 25 players, ten have received first-team all-conference honors in two seasons, five players have received them in three seasons, and one player has received them in all four seasons.

First-team All-Southwest Conference

First-team All-Southwest Conference
Year	Player	No.	Position	Career
1983	Terri Mackey	14	G	1981–83
1983	Annette Smith	15	F	1982–84, 1986
1984	Kamie Ethridge	33	PG	1983–86
1984	Fran Harris	20	G	1983–86
1984	Andrea Lloyd	25	F	1984–87
1984	Annette Smith	15	F	1982–84, 1986
1985	Kamie Ethridge	33	PG	1983–86
1985	Fran Harris	20	G	1983–86
1985	Andrea Lloyd	25	F	1984–87
1986	Clarissa Davis	24	F	1986–89
1986	Kamie Ethridge	33	PG	1983–86
1986	Fran Harris	20	G	1983–86
1986	Andrea Lloyd	25	F	1984–87
1987	Clarissa Davis	24	F	1986–89
1987	Andrea Lloyd	25	F	1984–87
1987	Beverly Williams	10	G	1985–88
1988	Beverly Williams	10	G	1985–88
1988	Yulonda Wimbish	34	G/F	1985–88
1989	Clarissa Davis	24	F	1986–89
1990	Edna Campbell	21	G	1990–91
1990	Vicki Hall	42	F	1989–93
1991	Edna Campbell	24	F	1990–91
1991	Vicki Hall	42	F	1989–93
1992	Cinietra Henderson	52	C	1990–93
1992	Nekeshia Henderson	6	G	1992–95
1993	Vicki Hall	42	F	1989–93
1993	Cinietra Henderson	52	C	1990–93
1994	Danielle Viglione	13	G	1994–97
1996	Erica Routt	32	F	1993–96

First-team All-Big 12 Conference

First-team All-Big 12 Conference
Year	Player	No.	Position	Career
1999	Edwina Brown	24	F	1997–2000
2000	Edwina Brown	24	F	1997–2000
2003	Heather Schreiber	21	F	2002–05
2003	Stacy Stephens	41	F	2001–04
2004	Jamie Carey	11	PG	2003–05
2004	Heather Schreiber	21	F	2002–05
2004	Stacy Stephens	41	F	2001–04
2005	Jamie Carey	11	PG	2003–05
2005	Tiffany Jackson	33	F	2004–07
2006	Tiffany Jackson	33	F	2004–07
2007	Tiffany Jackson	33	F	2004–07
2012	Chassidy Fussell	24	G	2011–14
2014	Nneka Enemkpali	3	F	2012–15
2015	Imani Boyette	34	C	2013–16
2016	Imani Boyette	34	C	2013–16
2016	Brooke McCarty	11	PG	2015–18
2017	Ariel Atkins	23	G	2015–18
2017	Joyner Holmes	24	G/F	2016–20
2017	Brooke McCarty	11	PG	2015–18
2018	Ariel Atkins	23	G	2015–18
2018	Brooke McCarty	11	PG	2015–18
2019	Sug Sutton	1	G	2017–20
2020	Charli Collier	35	F	2018–21
2021	Charli Collier	35	F	2018–21
2023	Rori Harmon	3	G	2021–present
2023	DeYona Gaston	5	F	2020–present
2024	Madison Booker	35	F	2023–present

First-team All-SEC

First-team All-SEC
Year	Player	No.	Position	Career
2025	Madison Booker	35	F	2023–present

==== Freshman Player of the Year ====
Ten Longhorn freshmen women's basketball players have won conference freshman of the year honors—six players in the Southwest Conference and four players in the Big 12 Conference.

Southwest Conference Freshman of the Year

Southwest Conference Freshman of the Year
Year	Player	No.	Position	Career
1984	Andrea Lloyd	25	F	1984–87
1986	Clarissa Davis	24	F	1986–89
1989	Vicki Hall	42	F	1989–93
1992	Nekeshia Henderson	6	G	1992–95
1994	Danielle Viglione	13	G	1994–97
1995	Angela Jackson	23	C	1995–98

Big 12 Conference Freshman of the Year

Big 12 Conference Freshman of the Year
Year	Player	No.	Position	Career
2002	Heather Schreiber	21	F	2002–05
2004	Tiffany Jackson	33	F	2004–07
2013	Imani Boyette	34	C	2013–16
2017	Joyner Holmes	24	G/F	2017–2020
2022	Rori Harmon	3	G	2021–present
2024	Madison Booker	35	F	2023–present

==== Conference tournament most valuable player ====
Nine Longhorn women's basketball players have won conference tournament most valuable player honors on 10 occasions.

Southwest Conference tournament Most Outstanding Player

Southwest Conference tournament Most Outstanding Player
Year	Player	No.	Position	Career
1983	Annette Smith	15	F	1982–84, 1986
1985	Fran Harris	20	G	1983–86
1986	Beverly Williams	10	G	1985–88
1987	Beverly Williams	10	G	1985–88
1988	Doreatha Conwell	50	F/C	1987–88
1989	Clarissa Davis	24	F	1986–89
1990	Edna Campbell	21	G	1990–91

Big 12 Conference tournament Most Valuable Player

Big 12 Conference tournament Most Valuable Player
Year	Player	No.	Position	Career
2000	Edwina Brown	24	F	1997–2000
2003	Stacy Stephens	41	F	2001–04
2022	Rori Harmon	3	G	2021–present
2024	Madison Booker	35	F	2023–present

=== Professional basketball ===
==== WNBA Draft history ====
As of November 4, 2021, 19 Longhorn women's basketball players have been selected in the WNBA draft since the inaugural draft in 1997. Of these, six were selected in the first round, two were selected in the second round, seven were selected in the third round, and two were selected in the fourth round.

Year	Round	Pick	Overall	Player	Team
1997	4	8	32	Catarina Pollini	Houston Comets
1998	4	3	33	Angela Jackson	Washington Mystics
1999	1	10	10	Edna Campbell	Phoenix Mercury
1999	2	10	22	Clarissa Davis-Wrightsil	Phoenix Mercury
1999	3	7	31	Andrea Lloyd	Minnesota Lynx
2000	1	3	3	Edwina Brown	Detroit Shock
2004	3	11	37	Stacy Stephens^{1}	Houston Comets
2005	3	5	31	Jamie Carey^{2}	Phoenix Mercury
2005	3	13	39	Heather Schreiber	Los Angeles Sparks
2007	1	5	5	Tiffany Jackson	New York Liberty
2010	3	9	33	Brittainey Raven	Atlanta Dream
2015	3	2	26	Nneka Enemkpali	Seattle Storm
2016	1	10	10	Imani Boyette	Chicago Sky
2018	1	7	7	Ariel Atkins	Washington Mystics
2020	2	7	19	Joyner Holmes^{3}	Seattle Storm
2020	3	12	36	Sug Sutton	Washington Mystics
2021	1	1	1	Charli Collier	Dallas Wings
2026	3	4	34	Rori Harmon	Washington Mystics

^{1}Later traded to Detroit Shock.
^{2}Later signed with Connecticut Sun.
^{3}Later signed with New York Liberty.

==== WNBA players ====
As of the 2026 WNBA season, 25 Texas players have played in the WNBA in league history. Three Longhorn players currently play in the WNBA.

All-time WNBA players

All-time Texas WNBA players
Player	Draft year	Round	Pick (Overall)	WNBA career	Teams
Fran Harris	1997	undrafted		1997–98	Houston Comets (1997); Utah Starzz (1998)
Nekeshia Henderson	1997	undrafted		2000–01	Houston Comets (2000–01)
Catarina pollini	1997	4	8th (32nd)	1997	Houston Comets (1997)
Danielle Viglione	1997	undrafted		1997	Sacramento Monarchs (1997)
Angela Jackson	1998	4	3rd (33rd)	1998	Washington Mystics (1998)
Edna Campbell	1999	1	10th (10th)	1999–2005	Phoenix Mercury (1999); Seattle Storm (2000); Sacramento Monarchs (2001–04); San Antonio Silver Stars (2005)
Clarissa Davis-Wrightsil	1999	2	10th (22nd)	1999	Phoenix Mercury (1999)
Andrea Lloyd-Curry	1999	3	7th (31st)	1999–2000	Minnesota Lynx (1999–2000)
Edwina Brown	2000	1	3rd (3rd)	2000–03, 2006	Detroit Shock (2000–02); Phoenix Mercury (2003); Houston Comets (2006)
Vicki Hall	2000	undrafted		2000–02	Cleveland Rockers (2000–01); Indiana Fever (2001); Los Angeles Sparks (2002)
Tai Dillard	2003	undrafted		2003–05	San Antonio Silver Stars (2003–05)
Stacy Stephens	2004	3	11th (37th)	2004	Detroit Shock (2004)
Jamie Carey	2005	3	5th (31st)	2005–08	Connecticut Sun (2005–08)
Tiffany Jackson	2007	1	5th (5th)	2007–15, 2017	New York Liberty (2007–10); Tulsa Shock (2010–15); Los Angeles Sparks (2017)
Carla Cortijo	2008	undrafted		2015–17	Atlanta Dream (2015–17)
Brittainey Raven	2010	3	9th (33rd)	2010	Atlanta Dream (2010)
Imani Boyette	2016	1	10th (10th)	2016–2019	Chicago Sky (2016–17); Atlanta Dream (2017–18); Dallas Wings (2019)
Ariel Atkins	2018	1	7th (7th)	2018–present	Washington Mystics (2018–2024) Chicago Sky (2025) Los Angeles Sparks (2026–present)
Brooke McCarty	2018	undrafted		2019	Dallas Wings (2019)
Joyner Holmes	2020	2	7th (19th)	2020–present	New York Liberty (2020–2021); Las Vegas Aces (2021); Connecticut Sun (2022); Los Angeles Sparks (2023); Seattle Storm (2023–2024) Las Vegas Aces (2025)
Sug Sutton	2020	3	12th (36th)	2020, 2023–present	Washington Mystics (2020); Phoenix Mercury (2023–2024) Washington Mystics (2024–2025) Portland Fire (2026–present)
Charli Collier	2021	1	1st (1st)	2021–2022	Dallas Wings (2021–2022)
Rori Harmon	2026	3	4th (34th)	2026–present	Washington Mystics (2026–present)

Current WNBA players

Texas players currently in the WNBA
Player	Draft year	Round	Pick (Overall)	WNBA career	Current team
Ariel Atkins	2018	1	7th (7th)	2018–present	Los Angeles Sparks (2026–present)
Sug Sutton	2020	3	12th (36th)	2020–present	Portland Fire (2026–present)
Rori Harmon	2026	3	4th (34th)	2026–present	Washington Mystics (2026–present)

==== American Basketball League (1996–98) players ====
Six Longhorn players played in the ABL.

All-time ABL players

All-time Texas ABL players
Player	ABL career	Teams
Clarissa Davis-Wrightsil	1996–98	New England Blizzard (1996–97); Long Beach StingRays (1997–98); San Jose Lasers (1998)
Andrea Lloyd-Curry	1996–98	Columbus Quest (1996–98)
Edna Campbell	1997–98	Colorado Xplosion (1997–98)
Vicki Hall	1997–98	Colorado Xplosion(1997–98); Nashville Noise (1998)
Beverly Williams	1997–98	Long Beach StingRays (1997–98)
Nekeshia Henderson	1998	San Jose Lasers (1998)

=== Olympians ===
Five Longhorn women's basketball players have competed in the Olympic Games in women's basketball, with three players winning gold medals and one player winning a bronze medal. Longhorn alumna Nell Fortner was head coach of gold medal-winning United States teams in 1996 and 2000. Former Longhorn coach Gail Goestenkors was an assistant coach for the United States team that won a gold medal in 2008.

Longhorns in the Olympics by year
Year	Player	Country	Medal
1988	Kamie Ethridge	United States	Gold medal
1988	Andrea Lloyd	United States	Gold medal
1992	Clarissa Davis	United States	Bronze medal
1992	Catarina Pollini	Italy	8th place (of 8)
1996	Catarina Pollini	Italy	8th place (of 12)
2021	Ariel Atkins	United States	Gold medal

=== Coaching honors and awards ===
==== Hall of Fame inductions ====
In October 1998, Jody Conradt became the second women's basketball coach to be inducted into the Naismith Memorial Basketball Hall of Fame in Springfield, Massachusetts. Conradt was also a member of the inaugural class elected to the Women's Basketball Hall of Fame in Knoxville, Tennessee in June 1999.

==== National Coach of the Year honors ====
Conradt won the WBCA National Coach of the Year Award following her 1984 season at Texas, in which her team posted a 32–3 overall record and reached the Elite Eight of the NCAA Tournament, and following the 1986 season, in which her team finished undefeated and won the NCAA championship.

==== Conference Coach of the Year honors ====
Jody Conradt was recognized as the Southwest Conference Coach of the Year for the 1984, 1985, 1986, 1987, 1988, and 1996 seasons and as the Big 12 Conference Coach of the Year for the 2003 and 2004 seasons. Karen Aston was named Big 12 Conference Coach of the Year in 2017. Vic Schaefer was named Big 12 Conference Coach of the Year in 2023 and SEC Coach of the Year in 2025.

== See also ==
- 1986 NCAA Division I women's basketball tournament
- Texas Longhorns men's basketball
