= Annette Smith-Knight =

American women's basketball player and coach

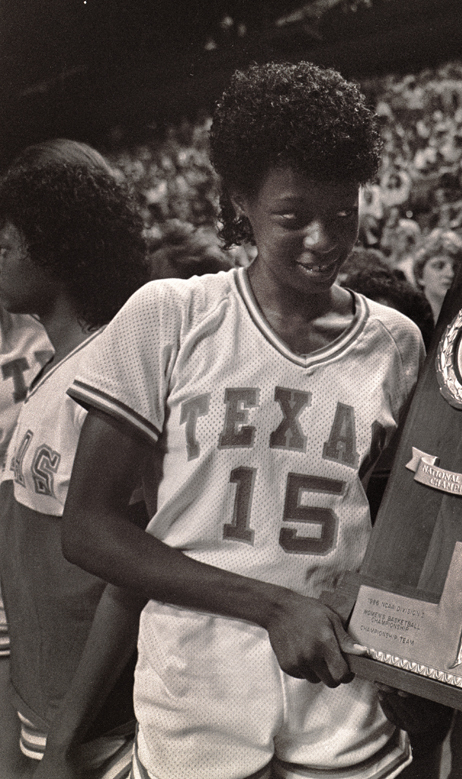
- Annette Smith holding the National Championship trophy (1986)

Career highlights
- Kodak All-American (1984)
- Women's Basketball Hall of Fame

Annette Smith-Knight (born 1962 or 1963) has worked in the community services department for the University of Texas at Austin since the mid-2000s. Smith began her time with Texas when she played for the Texas Longhorns women's basketball team during the 1980s. While with Texas, Smith appeared at the final of the 1982 AIAW National Division I Basketball Championship and won gold at the 1983 World University Games with the American basketball team. After not playing for over a year due to injury, Smith resumed playing in 1985 and won the 1986 NCAA Division I women's basketball tournament with the Longhorns. Following her 131 career games, Smith's school career records of 1052 field goals and 2523 points with Texas have remained the highest for over 30 years.

From the late 1980s to early 2000s, Smith Greene held various assistant coaching positions with Texas, Southwest Texas State University and the University of California, Irvine. Smith-Knight later worked in marketing for Texas during the early 2000s before her move to community services. Outside of basketball, Smith-Knight was previously hired by the Texas Secretary of State during the mid-1980s as a paralegal. Smith-Knight was inducted into the Women's Basketball Hall of Fame in 2013.

== Early life and education ==
In the early 1960s, Annette Smith was born in Bay City, Texas. Growing up, Smith and her siblings took part in basketball to avoid the assigned tasks given to them while their mother was not at home. In 1978, Smith competed in basketball and athletics with Bay City. After receiving a spot in the high jump for the 1979 3A championship, Smith did not compete in the event. During 1981, she played in the 4A final as a University Interscholastic League basketball player. She was named All-Tournament during that year's event.

For the University of Texas at Austin, Smith joined the Texas Longhorns women's basketball team in 1981. At the 1982 AIAW National Division I Basketball Championship, Smith and the Longhorns were defeated by Rutgers in the final. While at Texas, Smith won gold with the American women's basketball team during the 1983 World University Games. In March 1984, Smith tore her tibia and anterior cruciate ligament and had surgery to fix the injuries in her left knee. Due to her knee, Smith did not attempt to secure a spot on the women's basketball team for the 1984 Summer Olympics.

Following surgery, Smith underwent over a year of physical therapy and did not play on the team until November 1985. At the 1986 NCAA Division I women's basketball tournament, Smith and Texas won the championship final. That year, Smith completed her communications studies at Texas. Following her departure from Texas, Smith decided to sit out the 1988 Summer Olympics due to her earlier knee surgery.

During her 131 career games with the Longhorns, Smith had 1052 field goals and 966 rebounds while accumulating 2523 points. From 1982 to 1984, Smith had the most points and field goals for the Longhorns. Leading up to the 2020–21 season, Smith held the women's basketball career records in points and field goals at UT Austin for over 30 years. She also had the most season rebounds in 1982 and 1983 for the university.

== Career ==
At the beginning of her career, Smith worked in loans after university. In 1989, Annette Smith Greene was working for Texas in their loans department when she also started volunteering with the Longhorns in coaching. The following year, Smith Greene became an assistant coach for the Longhorns in May 1990 on a part time basis. She was later chosen to work as an assistant coach for Southwest Texas State University in July 1990 for their women's basketball team. After starting her role that year, Smith Greene remained at Southwest Texas before she was hired as an assistant coach for the women's basketball team at University of California, Irvine in June 1991.

After remaining with Irvine for a couple of years, Annette Smith returned to Texas to continue her assistant coaching tenure in 1993. While at Texas, Annette Smith-Knight was named assistant athletic director for basketball operations in 1998. Smith-Knight remained in basketball operations until moving to a marketing assistant role for Texas in 2003. By the mid-2000s, Smith-Knight entered the community services department for Texas as their coordinator. While working in community services, Smith-Knight continued to hold her coordinator position before being named the department's director in the early 2010s. Apart from her time at Texas, Smith-Knight was hired by the Texas Secretary of State during the mid-1980s and was a paralegal.

== Honors and personal life ==
Smith was named the Southwest Conference player of the year for women's basketball in 1983 and 1984. Smith was also a finalist for the 1984 Wade Trophy. In 2002, Smith-Knight was named to a Hall of Honor by the University of Texas at Austin.

Following her 2006 membership to the Texas Black Sports Hall of Fame, Smith-Knight became part of the Women's Basketball Hall of Fame in 2013. Smith-Knight also joined the Texas Association of Basketball Coaches Hall of Fame in 2017. During 2021, the UIL selected her as one of "the top 100 players ... in UIL history." Smith-Knight is married and has two children.
