= Rori Harmon =

American basketball player (born 2003)

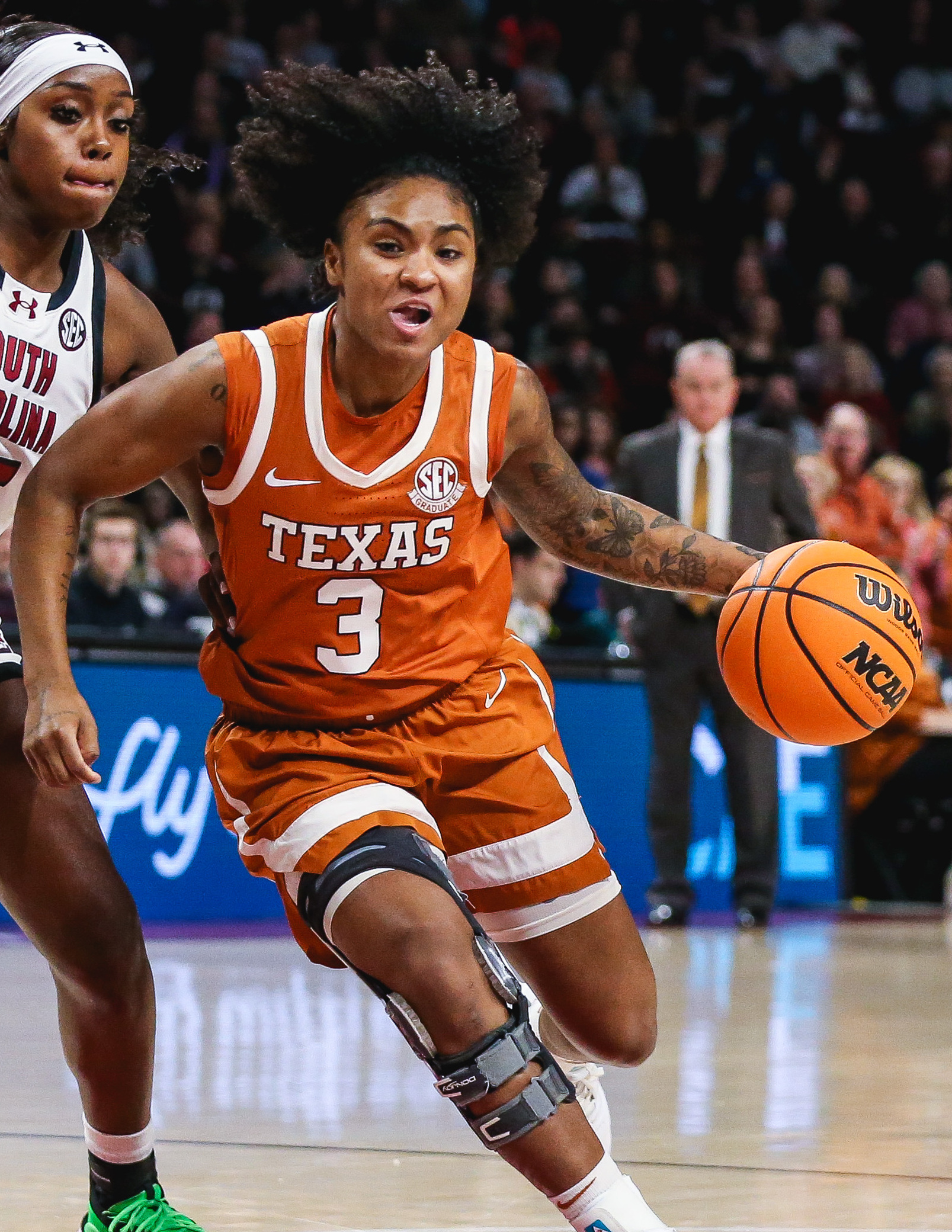
- Harmon with Texas in 2025

No. 3 – Washington Mystics
- Position: Point guard
- League: WNBA

Personal information
- Born: January 29, 2003 (age 23) Houston, Texas, U.S.
- Listed height: 5 ft 6 in (1.68 m)
- Listed weight: 146 lb (66 kg)

Career information
- High school: Cypress Creek (Houston, Texas)
- College: Texas (2021–2026)
- WNBA draft: 2026: 3rd round, 34th overall pick
- Drafted by: Washington Mystics

Career highlights
- Third-team All-American – USBWA (2026); 2× SEC All-Defensive Team (2025, 2026); First-team All-Big 12 (2023); Second-team All-Big 12 (2022); Big 12 Defensive Player of the Year (2023); 2× Big 12 All-Defensive Team (2022, 2023); Big 12 Freshman of the Year (2022); Big 12 All-Freshman Team (2022); Big 12 Tournament MOP (2022); McDonald's All-American (2021); Texas Miss Basketball (2021)
- Stats at Basketball Reference

Rori Harmon (born January 29, 2003) is an American professional basketball player for the Washington Mystics of the Women's National Basketball Association (WNBA). She played college basketball for the Texas Longhorns.

== Early life and high school career ==
Rori Harmon was born and raised in Houston, Texas. Harmon attended Cypress Creek High School where she played basketball and earned many accolades throughout her high school career. These highlights include McDonald's All-American in 2021, 2021 Houston Chronicle All-Greater Houston Girls Basketball Co-Player of the Year, and a Four-time Texas Association of Basketball Coaches all-state selection. At Cypress Creek High School, Harmon scored 2,572 points and had 745 assists with 700 steals in 146 games. Harmon's success on the basketball court gained lots of attention from national recruiting outlets. ESPN gave her a 5 star rating and a 97 overall rating. Furthermore, ESPN also named Harmon the 10th ranked point guard in the 2021 recruiting class. On April 24, 2020, Harmon committed to The University of Texas.

College recruiting
Name	Hometown	School	Height	Weight	Commit date
Rori Harmon; PG	Houston, TX	Cypress Creek High School	5 ft 6 in (1.68 m)	N/A	
Rori Harmon; PG	Recruit ratings: ESPN: (97)				
Overall recruit ranking: ESPN: —
Note: In many cases, Scout, Rivals, 247Sports, On3, and ESPN may conflict in their listings of height and weight.; In these cases, the average was taken. ESPN grades are on a 100-point scale.; Sources: "Texas 2021 Basketball Commitments". Rivals.; "2021 Team Ranking". Rivals.

== College career ==
Harmon had five years as a college player, as she had a medical redshirt from a knee injury in the 2023-24 season after 12 games As a freshman, Harmon quickly emerged as the starting point guard for the Longhorns. Harmon's 30 point career high against Iowa State played a major role in securing the first Big 12 Championship for the Longhorns since 2003. Harmon earned many accolades her freshman season. These accolades include 4-time Big 12 Freshman of the Week, All-Big 12 Second Team, Big 12 All-Defensive Team, Big 12 All-Freshman Team, Big 12 Freshman of the Year, and Big 12 Tournament Most Outstanding Player. Also, Harmon became the first freshman in Texas women’s basketball history to earn All-American honors as she was voted honorable mention by the Associated Press. Harmon also broke Terri Mackey’s record of most assists by a freshman in school history. On 02/05/2026, she broke the school’s all time steals record.

=== College statistics ===
NCAA statistics
Year	Team	GP	GS	MPG	FG%	3P%	FT%	RPG	APG	SPG	BPG	PPG
2021–22	Texas	36	34	30.0	39.7	31.9	73.3	4.4	5.0	2.4	0.0	11.4
2022–23	Texas	31	31	35.9	36.8	15.7	56.2	5.3	7.4	2.3	0.3	11.2
2023–24	Texas	12	12	27.4	52.3	31.8	66.7	5.6	7.8	3.1	0.2	14.1
2024–25	Texas	40	40	29.8	37.6	28.8	74.4	3.6	6.0	2.2	0.1	9.4
2025–26	Texas	39	39	29.7	45.2	44.8	71.0	3.4	6.3	2.8	0.2	8.4
Career		158	156	30.9	40.6	29.1	68.4	4.2	6.2	2.5	0.1	10.3
Statistics retrieved from Sports-Reference

== Professional career ==
On April 13, 2026, the Washington Mystics selected Harmon as the 34th overall pick of the 2026 WNBA draft. She appeared in ten games during her rookie season before being waived on August 8. She signed a developmental player contract with the team two days later.

== Personal life ==
In 2023, Harmon attended Kelsey Plum's Dawg Class, an Under Armour-sponsored camp to help top women college athletes transition from collegiate to professional basketball.

She is currently dating her former Texas Longhorns teammate, Shaylee Gonzales.
