= List of Oregon State University alumni =

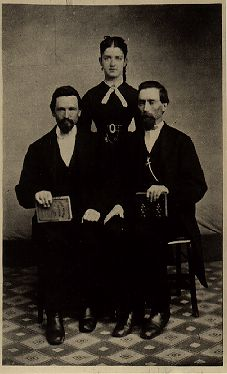
Corvallis College's first graduating class was in 1870, and consisted of three people.

Oregon State University is located in Corvallis, Oregon in the United States. It traces its roots to 1856, when Corvallis Academy was founded. It was not formally incorporated until 1858 when the name was changed to Corvallis College, and was not chartered until 1868. In 1890 the school became known as Oregon Agricultural College, then in 1927 as Oregon State Agricultural College. Its current name was adopted in 1961. Alumni from each of these eras may be included on the list. More than 200,000 people have attended the university since its founding.

== Activism ==
Name	Attended	Notability	Reference
Bobby Henderson	1999–2003	Activist and creator of Pastafarianism	
Bruce W. Klunder	?–1958	Civil rights activist and Presbyterian minister	
Katherine Ann Power	?—2001	Anti-war activist, convicted of armed robbery and manslaughter who spent fourteen years on the FBI Ten Most Wanted Fugitives list	
Ada-Rhodes Short	?—2018	Transgender rights activist and mechatronic design engineer	

== Art and architecture ==
Name	Attended	Notability	Reference
John Clem Clarke		Painter	
Florence Holmes Gerke	1896–1964	Landscape architect of the International Rose Test Garden	
Tala Madani	1999–2004	Artist, painter featured in the 2017 Whitney Biennial	
Lee Arden Thomas		Architect who designed the OSU Memorial Union	
Karen Carson	1966 BFA	Feminist artist, painting	

== Business ==
Name	Attended	Notability	Reference
Thomas J. Autzen	1905–1909	Plywood manufacturing pioneer	
Mercedes Alison Bates	?–1936	Former vice president of General Mills' Betty Crocker Cooking division; first female officer of General Mills	
Austen S. Cargill II	?	Heir and major shareholder of Cargill, received a PhD from Oregon State University	
Peggy Cherng	1969–1971	CEO of Panda Express	
Randy Conrads	?–1972	Founder of Classmates.com	
Peter Gassner	1983–1989	Co-founder and CEO of Veeva Systems	
Jen-Hsun Huang	1980–1984	Co-founder and former CEO of NVIDIA	
Timothy S. Leatherman	?–1970	Inventor of the Leatherman tool	
Brian McMenamin	?–1980	Co-founder of the McMenamins chain	
Mike McMenamin	?–1974	Co-founder of the McMenamins chain	
Bernie Newcomb	?–1965	Co-founder of E*TRADE	
Hüsnü Özyeğin		Turkish billionaire businessman, philanthropist	
Don Robert		CEO of Experian	
Leonard Shoen		Founder of U-Haul	
John A. Young	?–1953	Former president and CEO of Hewlett-Packard	

== Education ==
Name	Attended	Notability	Reference
Holly Barnard	?–2009	Professor of Geography at University of Colorado Boulder and founder of the Critical Zone Laboratory	
Sara Harris		Climate scientist and 3M National Teaching Fellow at the University of British Columbia	
Wayne L. Hubbell	?–1965	Jules Stein Professor of Ophthalmology at UCLA	
Octave Levenspiel	?–1991	Emeritus professor of chemical engineering at Oregon State University	
Staci Simonich		Dean of the College of Agricultural Sciences at Oregon State University	
Ann Streissguth		Endowed professor emeritus and founding director of the Fetal Alcohol Drug Unit at the University of Washington School of Medicine	
Carrie Halsell Ward	1922–1926	College lecturer and first Black student to graduate from OSU	
Michael Waterman	early 70s	Computational biologist; professor of biological science, mathematics, and computer science at the University of Southern California	

== Entertainment ==
Name	Attended	Notability	Reference
Trevor Bardette		Actor	
John Brotherton		Soap opera actor	
George Bruns	?–1936	Composer	
Meghna Chakrabarti	1994–1998	Journalist, radio producer, and host of the NPR program On Point	
Pinto Colvig	?–1911	Voice actor; the original Bozo the Clown	
Kevin Hagen		Actor	
Harley Jessup	?–1976	1987 Best Visual Effects Oscar winner for the film Innerspace	
Cathy Marshall		News anchor	
Beau Mirchoff	?–2024	Actor	
Roger Nichols		Recording engineer for Steely Dan	
Jodi Ann Paterson	?–1998	2000 Playboy Playmate of the Year and model	
Meredith Phillips		Star of ABC reality television show The Bachelorette	
Mike Rich		Screenwriter	
Laurie Roth		Syndicated radio talk-show host	
Travis Rush		Country music singer	
Laura Faye Smith		Voice actress	
Kendra Sunderland		Model and pornographic actress; expelled from the university for public indecency	
Sara Jean Underwood	2002–2007	July 2006 Playboy Playmate of the Month, 2007 Playmate of the Year, actress, and model	

== Literature and journalism ==
Name	Attended	Notability	Reference
Pamela Cytrynbaum		Journalist and restorative justice practitioner	
Geffrey Davis		Poet	
Webley Edwards	?–1927	World War II news correspondent	
Christopher Howell		Poet	
Chris Johns	1971–1974	Editor-in-chief of National Geographic magazine	
George Oppen		Poet and winner of the Pulitzer Prize for Poetry	
Mary Oppen		Poet	
Bert Sperling	1968–1972	Author and researcher	

== Military ==
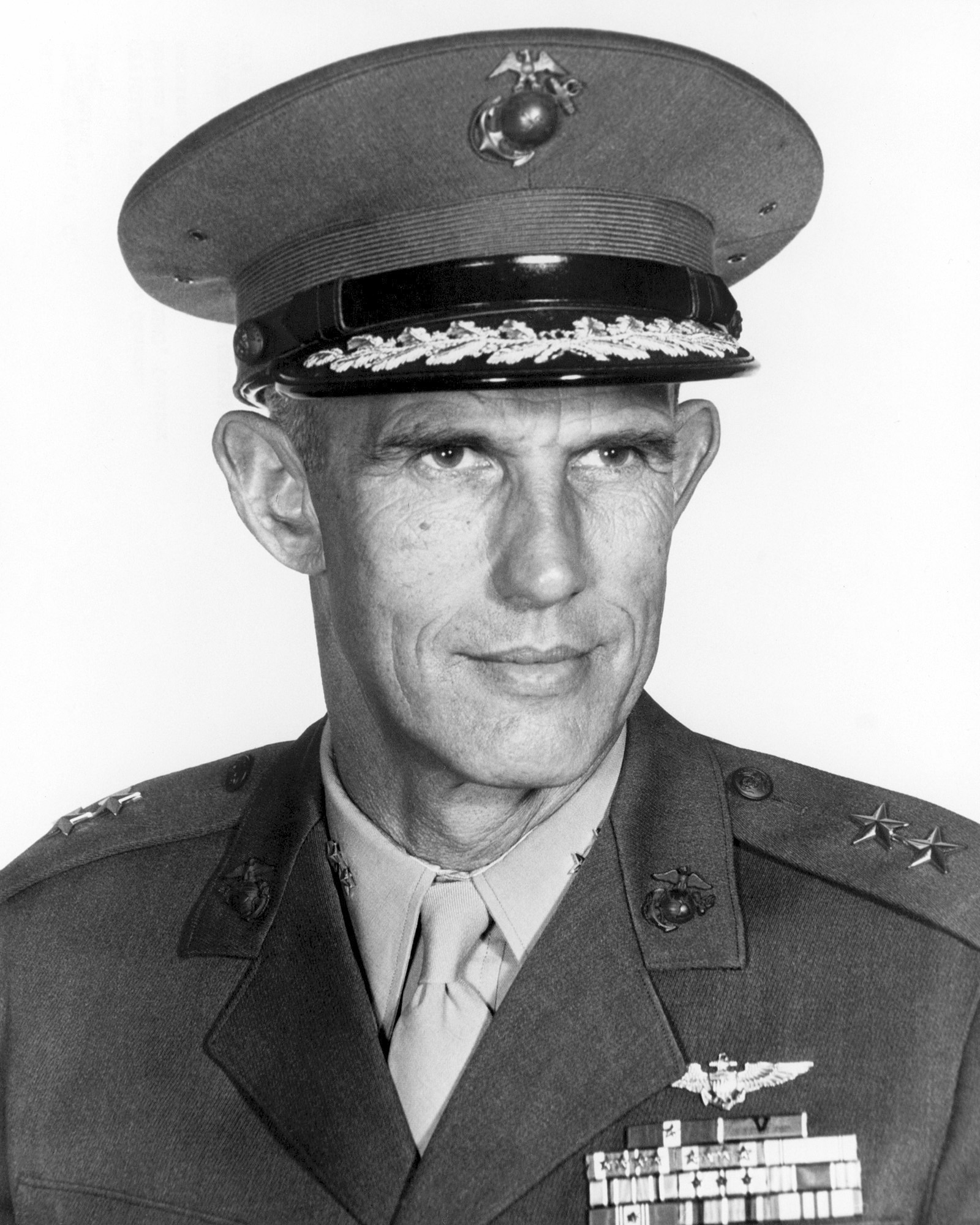
Marion Eugene Carl

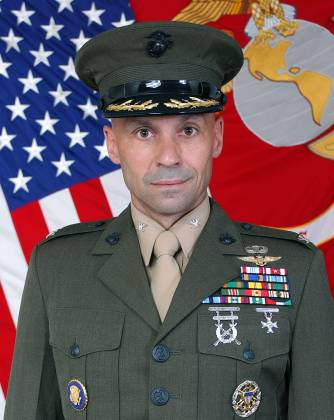
Anthony E. Van Dyke

Name	Attended	Notability	Reference
Edward C. Allworth	?–1916	Recipient of the Congressional Medal of Honor	
Rex T. Barber	?–1940	World War II pilot credited with killing Japanese Admiral Isoroku Yamamoto	
Marion Eugene Carl	?–1938	World War II flying ace; record-setting test pilot; United States Marine Corps (USMC) major general	
Elmer E. Hall		World War II brigadier general, USMC	
John Noble Holcomb	1967	Recipient of the Congressional Medal of Honor	
Ulysses G. McAlexander		Commander of Army ROTC; earned the nickname "Rock of the Marne" during World War I	
Anthony E. Van Dyke	?–1978	USMC colonel and current commander of Marine forces at Henderson Hall	

== Politics ==
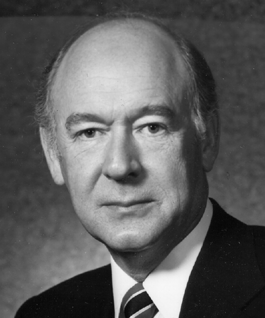
Cecil D. Andrus

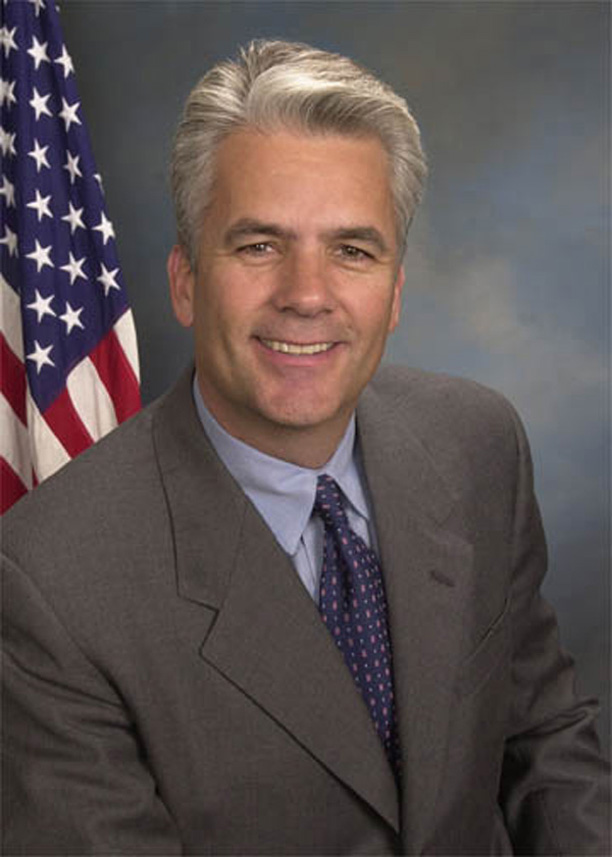
John Ensign

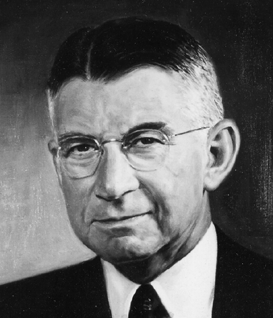
Douglas McKay

Name	Attended	Notability	Reference
Cecil D. Andrus	1952	Governor of Idaho (1971–1977, 1987–1995) and U.S. secretary of the interior (1977–1981)	
Earl I. Anzai	?–1964	Attorney general of Hawaii (1999–2002)	
Brad Avakian	?–1984	Commissioner of the Oregon Bureau of Labor and Industries (2008–2019)	
Rod Chandler	?–1968	U.S. representative of Washington (1983–1993)	
Charles Crookham	1941–1943	Attorney general of Oregon (1992–1993)	
John Ensign	?–1981	U.S. representative of Nevada (1995–1999); Nevada U.S. senator (2001–2011)	
John Hubert Hall	?–1923	Governor of Oregon (1947–1949); member of the Oregon House of Representatives (1936–1947)	
Julia Butler Hansen	1924–1926	U.S. representative of Washington (1960–1974)	
Darlene Hooley	?–1961	U.S. representative of Oregon (1997–2009)	
Elaine Hopson	1960	Oregon state representative	
Hector Macpherson, Jr.	1936–1940	Oregon state senator (1971–1974)	
Rich McCormick	1976–1980	Member of the US House of Representatives from Georgia (2023-present)	
Douglas McKay	?–1917	Governor of Oregon (1949–1952) and U.S. secretary of the interior (1953–1956)	
Paul Peek	?–?	California secretary of state (1940–1943); speaker of the California State Assembly (1939)	
Pou Sohtireak	?–1980s	Cambodian Minister for Industry, Mines and Energy	
Norris Poulson	1923	U.S. representative of California (1943–1945, 1947–1955); mayor of Los Angeles, California (1953–1961)	
Hedy Rijken	?	Oregon state representative (1989-1995)	
Frederick Steiwer	?–1902	Oregon U.S. senator (1927–1937)	
Lowell Stockman	?–1922	U.S. representative of Oregon (1943–1953)	
Jolene Unsoeld	1949–1951	U.S. representative of Washington (1989–1995)	
Robert M. Veatch	1868–1871	Oregon representative (1883–1886), senator (1887–1892), and mayor of Cottage Grove, Oregon	
James K. Weatherford	1868–1872	Oregon representative, Speaker of the House (1876), senator, and mayor of Albany, Oregon	
Mary Carlin Yates	?–1968	U.S. ambassador to the Republic of Burundi and U.S. ambassador to the Republic of Ghana	
Irwandi Yusuf	1993	Governor of Indonesian province of Aceh	

== Religion ==
Name	Attended	Notability	Reference
Bobby Henderson	?–2003	Activist and creator of Pastafarianism	
Katharine Jefferts Schori	?–1983	Presiding bishop of the Episcopal Church and oceanographer	

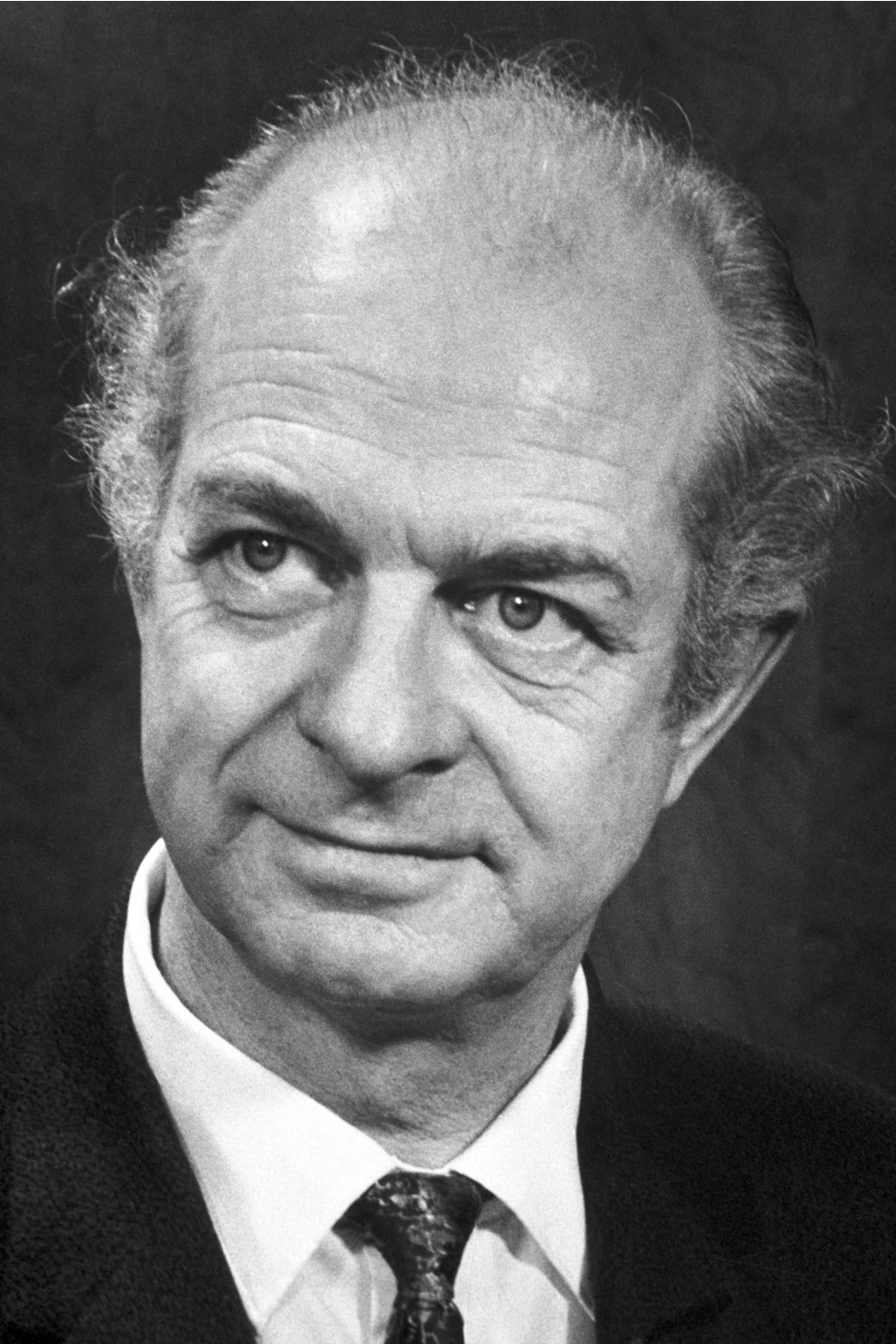
Linus Pauling

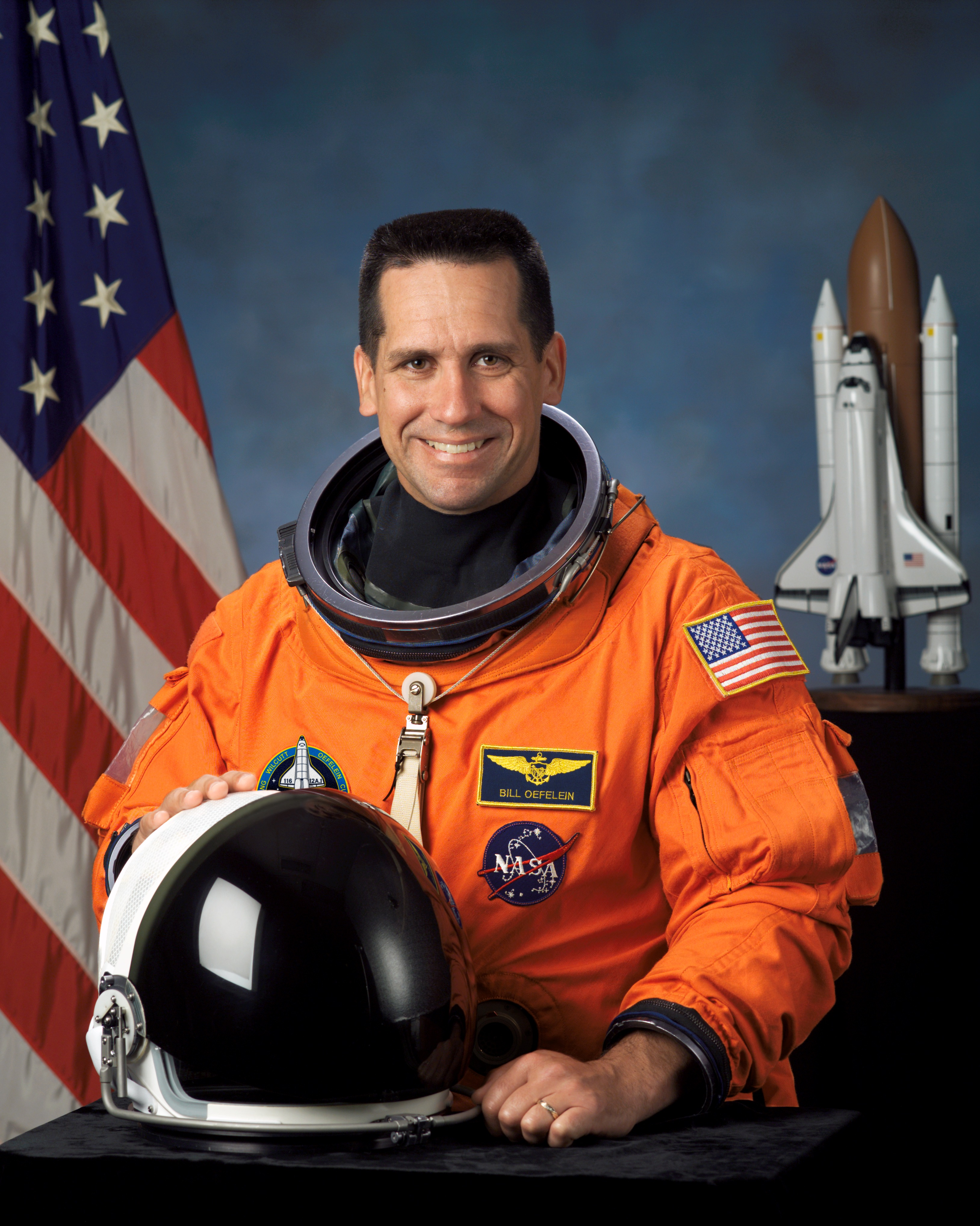
William Oefelein

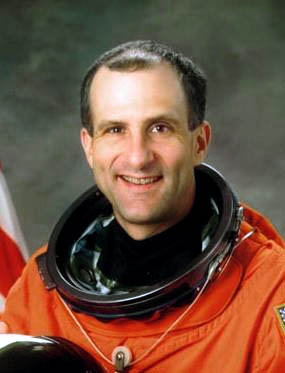
Donald Pettit

== Science and engineering ==
Name	Attended	Notability	Reference
Charity Dean	1995–2000	Epidemiologist, assistant director of the California Department of Public Health, and co-founder and CEO of the Public Health Company	
Paul H. Emmett	1917–1922	Manhattan Project research staff member and member of the United States National Academy of Sciences	
Milton Harris	1924–1926	Founded the Harris Research Laboratories, which later merged with Gillette	
Donald M. Kerr	?–1969	Wildlife biologist and founder of the High Desert Museum	
Ann Kiessling	?–1971	Reproductive biologist and leading stem cell researcher	
Glenn Odekirk	1923–1927	Hughes Aircraft aerospace engineer, helped design the H-4 Hercules	
William Oefelein	?–1988	NASA astronaut	
Linus Pauling	1917–1922	1954 Nobel Prize in Chemistry and 1962 Nobel Peace Prize recipient	
Donald Pettit	?–1978	NASA astronaut	
Stephen O. Rice		Pioneer in the related fields of information theory, communications theory, and telecommunications	
J. Michael Scott	?–1973	Ornithologist, research scientist, Peace Corps volunteer	
Ernest H. Taves		Psychiatrist, author, and UFO skeptic	
William Tebeau	1948	Chemical engineer and first African-American male graduate	
Earl A. Thompson		Inventor of the manual transmission synchronizer in 1923 and leader of the team at General Motors Corporation that developed the first Hydramatic automatic transmission in 1940	
Marta Torres	?–1988	Marine geologist known for her work on the geochemistry of cold seeps and methane hydrates	
Warren Washington	1954?–1958	Atmospheric scientist	

== Technology ==
Name	Attended	Notability	Reference
Philip Emeagwali	1974–1977	1989 Gordon Bell Prize winner	
Douglas Engelbart	?–1948	Inventor of the computer mouse and winner of the National Medal of Technology	
Jensen Huang	1980–1984	Founder of Nvidia and CEO of the company from 1993 to 2026	

== See also ==
- List of Oregon State University athletes
- List of Oregon State University faculty and staff
- List of people from Oregon
