= List of Oregon State University faculty and staff =

This is a list of notable former and current faculty and staff members of Oregon State University (OSU), a four-year research and degree-granting public university in Corvallis, Oregon in the United States. The university traces its roots back to 1856 when Corvallis Academy was founded. It was not formally incorporated until 1858 when the name was changed to Corvallis College, and wasn't chartered until 1868, when the name was changed to Corvallis College and Agricultural College of Oregon. The university changed names several more times, adopting its current name in 1961.^{[i]} Faculty and staff from each of these eras may be included on the list, and more than 2,900 people are currently employed there.

== Academics ==
=== Faculty ===
Name	Worked	Position and notability	Reference
Ira S. Allison		Professor of geology, namesake of Lake Allison, author	
Edward Allworth	1925–1963	Former secretary of the OSU Alumni Association; former secretary of the Memorial Union Board of Governors; former manager of the Memorial Union; Medal of Honor recipient	
John B. Anderson	1986	Former visiting professor; former U.S. representative of Illinois (1961–1981); presidential candidate in the 1980 presidential election	
Scott Baker	?–	Associate director of the Marine Mammal Institute	
Kelly Benoit-Bird	2004–2018	Former professor in the College of Earth, Ocean and Atmospheric Sciences; studies trophic interactions in the marine ecosystem using active underwater acoustics; winner of a Genius Grant from the MacArthur Fellows Program	
Abram Samoilovitch Besicovitch	1964	Visiting professor of mathematics in 1964; worked mainly on combinatorial methods and questions in real analysis, such as the Kakeya needle problem and the Hausdorff-Besicovitch dimension	
Marcus Borg	1979–	Professor of philosophy; biblical scholar	
Ernest J. Briskey	1979–1986	Former dean of agriculture and food science researcher	
John V. Byrne	1960–1981, 1984–1995	Administrator, National Oceanic and Atmospheric Administration (NOAA), 1981–1984; president, Oregon State University, 1984–1995	
James Cassidy	2004–	Instructor of soil science; a founding member of the band Information Society	
Sharyn Clough	2003–	Associate professor of philosophy; author of two books	
Jack Corliss	1977–1983	Former professor of oceanography; contributed to the discovery of black smokers and the resulting contributions to the theory on the origin of life	
Brent Dalrymple	1994–2001	Former dean of the College of Oceanic and Atmospheric Sciences; author; member of United States National Academy of Sciences; winner of National Medal of Science	
Tracy Daugherty	1986–2013	Author and biographer in the College of Liberal Arts; Guggenheim Fellowship recipient and finalist for the Pulitzer Prize in Biography	
John R. Dellenback	1949–1951	Former professor, former U.S. representative of Oregon (1967–1975)	
Sigmund Eisner		Professor emeritus, Chaucer scholar	
Kelly Falkner	1992–2011	Former professor, College of Earth, Oceanic and Atmospheric Sciences	
Sally Hacker	1977–1991	Sociologist	
Joel Hedgpeth	1965–1973	Former director of the Yaquina Biological Laboratories of the OSU Marine Science Center; marine biologist; environmentalist; author	
Octave Levenspiel	1966–1991	Emeritus professor of chemical engineering; author of five books; member of National Academy of Engineering	
Ted Lewis	?–1993	Former professor of computer science; author of 30 books; former editor-in-chief of IEEE Software magazine and Computer magazine	
Jane Lubchenco	1977–	Professor of zoology; ecologist; member of the United States National Academy of Sciences; first woman to serve as the administrator of the National Oceanic and Atmospheric Administration (NOAA), 2009–2013	
Bernard Malamud	1949–1961	Former professor; author; Pulitzer Prize recipient for novel The Fixer, later made into an Academy Award-nominated film	
Ed McClanahan	1958–1962	Former English professor; author of eight novels; essayist	
Conde McCullough	1916–1919	Former professor of engineering; designed most of Oregon's coastal bridges along U.S. Route 101	
Lois Sather McGill	1945–1983	First female faculty member of the Department of Food Science and Technology	
Victor Arviel Madsen	1931–2008	Nuclear physicist and faculty member of Oregon State University	
Joseph Millar	?	English professor, author, and poet	
Alvin O'Konski	1929–1931	Former professor, former U.S. representative of Wisconsin (1943–1973)	
Linus Pauling	1922	Former undergraduate faculty; 1954 Nobel Prize in Chemistry; 1962 Nobel Peace Prize recipient; the only person to win two unshared Nobel Prizes	
William Luther Pierce	1962–1965	Former assistant professor of physics; author of two books; later a notable white supremacist	
George Poinar Jr.	1995–	Professor of entomology; his work extracting DNA from insects fossilized in amber was the inspiration for the novel and film Jurassic Park	
Dana Reason	2008-	Director of the Popular Music Studies Program and acclaimed Canadian pianist and composer	
Heidi Schellman	1957	Professor of Physics, head of Physics Department, particle physicist	
Katharine Jefferts Schori	1994–1999	26th presiding bishop of the US Episcopal Church; earned B.S. in biology from Stanford University in 1974, a M.S. in oceanography in 1977 and a Ph.D. in oceanography in 1983, from Oregon State University; visiting assistant professor in OSU's Department of Religious Studies; visiting scientist in OSU's College of Oceanography	
John E. Sloan	1938–1940	Professor of military science and tactics	
Rick Spinrad	2010–2014, 2016–2021	Administrator, National Oceanic and Atmospheric Administration (NOAA), 2021–2025; earned MS (1978) and PhD (1982) in Oceanography at OSU; vice president for Research, OSU, 2010-2014; professor in Oceanography, OSU, 2016–2021	
Bernadine Strik	1987–2021	Horticulturist	
William "Bill" Warren	1991–2009	Emeritus professor of physics;contributed to solid-state physics research, graduate education, and departmental leadership at Oregon State University	
Douglas Warrick		Assistant professor of biophysics; has had two papers published in Nature	
Angelicque White	2009–2018	Former associate professor in the College of Earth, Ocean and Atmospheric Sciences; studies elemental cycling in oligotrophic marine ecosystems; current director of the Hawaii Ocean Time-series program at the University of Hawaii at Manoa	
Ernest H. Wiegand	1919–1952	Former professor of food science, developed the modern Maraschino cherry	
Roger J. Williams	?–1939	Former professor of chemistry; author of 22 books; discovered several B vitamins and pantothenic acid; former member of the United States National Academy of Sciences; president of the American Chemical Society	
William Appleman Williams	1968–1986	Former history professor; author; historian	
James Withycombe	1898–1914	Former director of the OSU College Experiment Station, former Governor of Oregon (1915–1919)	

=== Presidents ===
Name	Worked	Position and notability	Reference
F. King Alexander	2020–2021	20th president of Oregon State University	
Benjamin L. Arnold	1872–1892	3rd president of Oregon State University	
Frank L. Ballard	1940–1941	10th president of Oregon State University	
John M. Bloss	1892–1896	5th president of Oregon State University	
John V. Byrne	1984–1995	16th president of Oregon State University	
Joseph Emery	1872	2nd president of Oregon State University (acting)	
William A. Finley	1865–1872	1st president of Oregon State University	
Thomas M. Gatch	1897–1907	7th president of Oregon State University	
Francois A. Gilfillan	1941–1942	11th president of Oregon State University (acting)	
James H. Jensen	1961–1969	13th president of Oregon State University	
Rebecca L. Johnson	2021–2022	21st president of Oregon State University (acting)	
William Jasper Kerr	1907–1932	8th president of Oregon State University	
John D. Letcher	1892	4th president of Oregon State University (acting)	
Robert W. MacVicar	1970–1984	15th president of Oregon State University	
Henry B. Miller	1896–1897	6th president of Oregon State University	
Jayathi Y. Murthy	2022–	22nd president of Oregon State University	
George W. Peavy	1932–1940	9th president of Oregon State University (1932–1934)	
Edward John Ray	2003–2020	19th and current president of Oregon State University	
Paul G. Risser	1995–2002	17th president of Oregon State University	
August L. Strand	1942–1961	12th president of Oregon State University	
Timothy P. White	2002–2003	18th president of Oregon State University (acting)	
Roy A. Young	1969–1970	14th president of Oregon State University (acting)	

== Athletics ==
=== Baseball ===
Name	Worked	Position and notability	Reference
Pat Casey	1995–2018	Former head coach of the Oregon State Beavers baseball team; won three national titles	
Ralph Coleman	1923–1928, 1930–1931, 1938–1966	Former head coach of the Oregon State Beavers baseball team	
Fielder Jones	1910	Former head coach of the Oregon State Beavers baseball team; former manager of the Chicago White Sox and Baltimore Orioles	
Dan Spencer	1997–2007	Former associate head coach of the Oregon State Beavers baseball team	

=== Basketball ===
Name	Worked	Position and notability	Reference
Michael Holton	1995–1996	Former assistant coach of the Oregon State Beavers men's basketball team; former NBA player	
Jay John	2002–2008	Former head coach of the Oregon State Beavers men's basketball team	
Ritchie McKay	2000–2002	Former head coach of the Oregon State Beavers men's basketball team	
Ralph Miller	1970–1989	Former head coach of the Oregon State Beavers men's basketball team and Basketball Hall of Fame member	
Kevin Mouton	2002–2008	Former interim head coach and assistant coach of the Oregon State Beavers men's basketball team	
Eddie Payne	1995–2000	Former head coach of the Oregon State Beavers men's basketball team	
Craig Robinson	2008–2014	Former head coach of the Oregon State Beavers men's basketball team; former head coach of the Brown Bears	
LaVonda Wagner	2005–2010	Former head coach of the Oregon State Beavers women's basketball team	

- Stephen Thompson Jr. (born 1997), basketball player in the Israeli Basketball Premier League

=== Football ===
==== Head coaches ====
Name	Worked	Position and notability	Reference
Dee Andros	1965–1975	Former head coach of the Oregon State Beavers football team	
Joe Avezzano	1980–1984	Former head coach of the Oregon State Beavers football team; current special teams coach for the Las Vegas Raiders	
Bill Bloss	1893, 1897	Former head coach of the Oregon State Beavers football team	
Tommy Code	1896	Former head coach of the Oregon State Beavers football team	
Sam Dolan	1911–1912	Former head coach of the Oregon State Beavers football team	
Paul Downing	1895	Former head coach of the Oregon State Beavers football team	
Dennis Erickson	1999–2002	Former head coach of the Oregon State Beavers football team; former head coach of the Seattle Seahawks and the San Francisco 49ers; current head coach of the Arizona State Sun Devils football team	
Craig Fertig	1976–1979	Former head coach of the Oregon State Beavers football team	
Fred Herbold	1902	Former head coach of the Oregon State Beavers football team	
Guy Kennedy	1894	Former head coach of the Oregon State Beavers football team	
Dave Kragthorpe	1985–1990	Former head coach of the Oregon State Beavers football team	
Thomas L. McFadden	1903	Former head coach of the Oregon State Beavers football team	
Sol Metzger	1909	Former head coach of the Oregon State Beavers football team	
F. S. Norcross	1906–1908	Former head coach of the Oregon State Beavers football team	
Jerry Pettibone	1991–1996	Former head coach of the Oregon State Beavers football team	
Joseph Pipall	1916–1917	Former head coach of the Oregon State Beavers football team	
Tommy Prothro	1955–1964	Former head coach of the Oregon State Beavers football team; College Football Hall of Fame member	
Mike Riley	1997–1998, 2003–2014	Former head coach of the Oregon State Beavers football team; former head coach of the San Diego Chargers; current University of Nebraska–Lincoln head coach	
George Schildmiller	1910	Former head coach of the Oregon State Beavers football team	
Paul J. Schissler	1924–1932	Former head coach of the Oregon State Beavers football team	
Allen Steckle	1904–1905	Former head coach of the Oregon State Beavers football team	
Highland Stickney	1899	Former head coach of the Oregon State Beavers football team	
Lon Stiner	1933–1942, 1945–1948	Former head coach of the Oregon State Beavers football team	
Kip Taylor	1949–1954	Former head coach of the Oregon State Beavers football team	

==== Assistant coaches ====
Name	Worked	Position and notability	Reference
Mark Banker	1997–1998, 2003–	Current defensive coordinator for the Oregon State Beavers football team; former defensive coordinator for the San Diego Chargers	
Rich Brooks	1963–1964, 1965–1970	1994 Paul "Bear" Bryant Award winner; 1996 Home Depot Coach of the Year; former assistant coach of the Oregon State Beavers football team; former head coach of the St. Louis Rams; current head football coach for the Kentucky Wildcats	
John Cooper	1963–1964	Former assistant coach of the Oregon State Beavers football team; former head coach of the Ohio State Buckeyes football team	
Jim Gilstrap	1997–1998, 2003–2007	Former assistant coach of the Oregon State Beavers football team; former head coach of the Ottawa Rough Riders	
Danny Langsdorf	1997–1998, 2005–	Current offensive coordinator and quarterback coach for the Oregon State Beavers football team; former offensive coordinator for the New Orleans Saints	
Bronco Mendenhall	1989–1990, 1995–1996	Former assistant coach of the Oregon State Beavers football team; current head football coach of the BYU Cougars	

=== Wrestling ===
Name	Worked	Position and notability	Reference
Randy Couture	1993–1998	Former assistant coach and strength and conditioning coach for the Oregon State Beavers wrestling team; mixed martial artist; Ultimate Fighting Championship (UFC) Hall of Fame member	
Les Gutches	1996–1999, 2001–?	Former assistant coach of the Oregon State Beavers wrestling team; two-time NCAA champion; 1998 Goodwill Games gold medalist; bronze medalist at the 1999 World Championships; 1996 Olympic U.S. wrestling team member	
Chris Pendleton	2020–present	Current head coach of the Oregon State Beavers wrestling team; two-time national champion	
Robin Reed	1925–1926	Former head coach of the Oregon State Beavers wrestling team; 1924 Summer Olympics gold medalist; National Wrestling Hall of Fame member	
Greg Strobel	1981–1983	Former assistant coach of the Oregon State Beavers wrestling team; two-time NCAA champion; current head wrestling coach at Lehigh University	
Dale O. Thomas	1957–1990	Former head coach of the Oregon State Beavers wrestling team; National Wrestling Hall of Fame member	
Jim Zalesky	2006–2020	Former head coach of the Oregon State Beavers wrestling team; three-time NCAA champion; National Wrestling Hall of Fame member	

=== Multi-sport ===
Name	Worked	Position and notability	Reference
Slats Gill	1926–1966	Former head coach of the Oregon State Beavers baseball and men's basketball teams; Basketball Hall of Fame member	
Homer Woodson Hargiss	1918–1920	Former head coach of the Oregon State Beavers football and men's basketball teams	
Dick Rutherford	1920–1923	Former head coach of the Oregon State Beavers football and men's basketball teams	
E. J. Stewart	1911–1916	Former head coach of the Oregon State Beavers baseball, football, and men's basketball teams	

=== Other ===
Name	Worked	Position and notability	Reference
Terry Liskevych	2006–	Current head coach of the Oregon State Beavers women's volleyball team; former head coach of the U.S. Olympic women's volleyball team	
Mariusz Podkościelny	1997–2003	Former head coach of the Oregon State Beavers women's swimming team and competitor at the 1988 Summer Olympics	

== See also ==
- List of Oregon State University alumni
- List of people from Oregon

== Notes ==
i. ^ ^{a} The university also changed its name to Corvallis State Agricultural College in 1872, Corvallis College and State Agricultural College in 1879, Corvallis Agricultural College in 1881, Corvallis College and Oregon State Agricultural College in 1882, Oregon State Agricultural College in 1883, Corvallis College and Oregon Agricultural College in 1885, State Agricultural College of Oregon in 1886, State Agricultural College of the State of Oregon in 1888, Oregon Agricultural College in 1890, Agricultural College of the State of Oregon in 1896, Oregon Agricultural College (again) in 1908, and Oregon State College in 1937.
