= List of Oregon State University athletes =

This list of Oregon State University athletes includes graduates, non-graduate former students and current students of Oregon State University who are notable for their achievements within athletics, sometimes before or after their time at Oregon State. Other alumni can be found in the list of Oregon State University alumni; notable administration, faculty, and staff can be found on the list of Oregon State University faculty and staff. All intercollegiate sports teams at Oregon State are called the Oregon State Beavers.

== Baseball ==
Name	Attended	Notability	Reference
Scott Anderson	1981–1984^{†}	Major League Baseball (MLB) pitcher in 1987, 1990, and 1995	
Andy Baldwin	2003–2004^{†}	Minor league pitcher for the Rochester Red Wings	
Brian Barden	2000–2002^{†}	MLB infielder, 2007–2010; current Nippon Professional Baseball infielder for the Hiroshima Toyo Carp	
Lute Barnes	1967–1969^{†}	MLB player, 1972–1973	
Darwin Barney	2005–2007^{†}	MLB second baseman for the Chicago Cubs	
Bob Beall	1968–1970^{†}	MLB player in 1975, 1978–1980	
Dallas Buck	2004–2005^{†}	Minor league pitcher for the Carolina Mudcats	
Jamie Burke	1992–1993^{†}	MLB player in 2001, 2003–2005, and 2007–2010	
Mitch Canham	2004–2007^{†}	Minor league catcher for the Midland RockHounds	
Ed Coleman	1924^{†}	MLB outfielder, 1932–1936	
Ralph Coleman^{‡}	1918^{†}	Oregon State Beavers baseball head coach, 1923–1928, 1930–1931, and 1938–1966	
Michael Conforto		MLB All-Star and former New York Mets outfielder	
Jeff Doyle	1975–1977^{†}	MLB second baseman in 1983	
Glenn Elliott	1940–1942^{†}	MLB pitcher, 1947–1949	
Jacoby Ellsbury	2003–2005	MLB outfielder for the New York Yankees; MLB champion with the Boston Red Sox in 2007 and 2013; 2011 MLB All-Star; first Native American of Navajo descent to reach the Major Leagues	
Ken Forsch	1967–1968^{†}	MLB pitcher, 1970–1986; two-time MLB All-Star	
Cole Gillespie	2004–2006^{†}	MLB outfielder for the Arizona Diamondbacks	
Don Johnson	1932^{†}	MLB player, 1943–1948; two-time MLB All-Star	
Eddie Kunz	2005–2007^{†}	MLB pitcher for the San Diego Padres	
Steven Kwan		Cleveland Guardians outfielder, 2022 Gold Glove Award, and 2022 Fielding Bible Award winner	
John Leovich	1940^{†}	MLB catcher in 1941	
Steve Lyons	1979–1981^{†}	MLB player, 1985–1993; current television sportscaster	
Mark McLemore	2000–2002^{†}	MLB pitcher in 2007	
Wade Meckler		Outfielder for the San Francisco Giants	
Jonah Nickerson	2004–2006^{†}	2006 College World Series Most Outstanding Player; current Minor league pitcher for the Erie SeaWolves	
Jorge Reyes	2007–2009^{†}	2007 College World Series Most Outstanding Player; current Minor league pitcher for the San Antonio Missions	
Adley Rutschman	2017–2019^{†}	2023 MLB All-Star, Baltimore Orioles catcher, and 2019 Golden Spikes winner	
Wes Schulmerich	1925–1927^{†}	MLB outfielder, 1931–1934	
Mike Stutes	2005–2008^{†}	MLB pitcher for the Philadelphia Phillies	
Mike Thurman	1992–1994^{†}	MLB pitcher, 1997–2002	
Chris Wakeland	1995–1996^{†}	MLB right fielder in 2001	
Jim Wilson	1980–1982^{†}	MLB player in 1985, 1989	
Trevor Wilson	1985	MLB pitcher, 1988–1993, 1995, 1998	
Bob Wolcott	2005–?	MLB pitcher, 1995–1999	

== Basketball ==
Name	Attended	Notability	Reference
Brent Barry	1990–1995	NBA shooting guard for the San Antonio Spurs; 1996 Slam Dunk Contest winner; 2005 and 2007 NBA champion	
Vic Bartolome	1967–1970^{†}	NBA center, 1971–1972	
Lew Beck	?–1947	1948 Summer Olympics gold medalist as a member of the United States men's national basketball team	
Corey Benjamin	1996–1998^{†}	NBA guard, 1998–2003	
Ricky Berry	1983–1984^{†}	NBA power forward, 1988–1989	
Ray Blume	1977–1981^{†}	NBA guard, 1981–1982	
Fred Boyd	1969–1972^{†}	NBA guard, 1972–1978	
Jay Carty	1959–1962^{†}	NBA power forward, 1968–1969	
Lester Conner	1980–1982^{†}	NBA point guard, 1982–1995	
Mel Counts	1961–1964^{†}	NBA center, 1964–1976; 1965 and 1966 NBA champion; 1960 Summer Olympics gold medalist as a member of the United States men's national team, a squad inducted as a unit to the Naismith Memorial Basketball Hall of Fame	
Jared Cunningham	2009–2012^{†}	2011–12 All-Pac-12 First Team selection; playing in the Israeli Basketball Premier League	
Chelle Flamoe	1986–1989^{†}	Former member of the United States women's national basketball team	
Gary Freeman	1967–1970^{†}	NBA power forward, 1970–1971	
Dave Gambee	1955–1958^{†}	NBA small forward, 1958–1970; 1967 NBA champion	
Slats Gill^{‡}	1920–1924	Former head coach of the Oregon State Beavers baseball and men's basketball teams;Naismith Memorial Basketball Hall of Fame member	
A.C. Green	1981–1985^{†}	NBA power forward, 1985–2001; one-time NBA All-Star; 1987, 1988, and 2000 NBA champion; holds the NBA record for consecutive games played, at 1,192	
Swede Halbrook	1953–1956^{†}	NBA center, 1960–1962	
Scott Haskin	1988–1993^{†}	NBA power forward, 1993–1994	
Jim Jarvis	1962–1965^{†}	NBA guard, 1967–1969	
Steve Johnson	1976–1981	NBA center, 1981–1991; holds the NCAA men's basketball records for career field goal percentage, single season field goal percentage, and field goal percentage as a junior and senior, and is tied for the single game field goal percentage record (12+ field goals attempted)	
Tanja Kostic	1992–1996^{†}	Consensus All-American as a member of the Oregon State Beavers women's basketball team in 1996 and Pacific-10 Conference (Pac-10) Player of the Year in 1995 and 1996	
John Mandic	1939–1942^{†}	NBA small forward, 1948–1950	
Carol Menken-Schaudt	1978–1981^{†}	1984 Summer Olympics gold medalist as a member of the United States women's national basketball team	
José Ortiz	1985–1987^{†}	NBA power forward, 1988–1990; former member of the Puerto Rico national basketball team	
Gary Payton	1986–1990^{†}	NBA point guard, 1990–2007; nine-time NBA All-Star; two-time All-NBA First Team member; 2006 NBA champion; 1996 and 2000 Summer Olympics gold medalist as a member of the United States men's national basketball team; Naismith Memorial Basketball Hall of Fame member	
Gary Payton II		2022 NBA champion, currently playing for the Golden State Warriors	
Loy Petersen	1965–1968^{†}	NBA guard, 1968–1970	
Mark Radford	1977–1981^{†}	NBA guard, 1981–1983	
Felicia Ragland	1998–2002^{†}	WNBA player, 2002–2005	
Red Rocha	1944–1947^{†}	NBA center, 1947–1957; two-time NBA All-Star; 1955 NBA champion; former head coach of the Detroit Pistons and the Hawaii Rainbow Warriors men's basketball team	
Lonnie Shelton	1973–1973^{†}	NBA small forward, 1976–1986; 1979 NBA champion	
Charlie Sitton	1980–1984^{†}	NBA small forward, 1984–1985	
Bill Wold		Basketball player for the Hapoel Tel Aviv basketball team in the Israeli Basketball Premier League	

== Football (American) ==
Name	Attended	Notability	Reference
Al Afalava	2005–2008^{†}	NFL safety for the Indianapolis Colts	
James Allen	1998–2001^{†}	National Football League (NFL) linebacker for the New Orleans Saints	
Derek Anderson	2001–2004^{†}	NFL quarterback for the Carolina Panthers and one-time Pro Bowler	
Fred Anderson	1973–1975^{†}	NFL defensive lineman, 1978–1982	
Juddy Ash	1918, 1922^{†}	NFL guard in 1926	
Bill Austin	1945–1948^{†}	NFL player, 1949–1950, 1953–1957; former head coach of the Pittsburgh Steelers and Washington Redskins	
Sam Baker	1950–1952^{†}	NFL player in 1953, 1956–1969	
Terry Baker	1960–1962^{†}	1962 Heisman Trophy winner; 1962 Maxwell Award winner; 1962 Sportsman of the Year; NFL player, 1963–1965; College Football Hall of Fame member	
Nick Barnett	1999–2002^{†}	NFL linebacker for the Green Bay Packers	
Ted Bates	1956–1958^{†}	NFL linebacker, 1959–1962; AFL player in 1963	
Gil Bergerson	1930–1931^{†}	NFL player, 1932–1936	
Yvenson Bernard	2005—2007^{†}	Running back for the Winnipeg Blue Bombers; 6th on the list of most rushing yards in Pac-10 history	
Dennis Boyd	1973–1976^{†}	NFL lineman, 1977–1979, 1981–1982	
Jerome Boyd	1981–1982^{†}	NFL linebacker in 1983	
Darrick Brilz	1983–1986^{†}	NFL offensive lineman, 1987–1998	
Brandon Browner	2003–2004^{†}	NFL cornerback in 2005; current New England Patriot	
Matt Bryant		NFL placekicker for the Atlanta Falcons	
Mike Burke		NFL player in 1974	
Vern Burke	1962–1963^{†}	NFL tight end, 1965–1967	
Victor Butler	2005–2008^{†}	Linebacker for the New Orleans Saints	
Reggie Bynum	1982–1985^{†}	NFL wide receiver in 1987	
Zuck Carlson	1926–1928^{†}	NFL player, 1929–1936	
Ken Carpenter	1946–1949^{†}	1955 Jeff Nicklin Memorial Trophy winner; 1955 Dave Dryburgh Memorial Trophy winner; NFL player, 1950–1953; CFL player 1954–1959; AFL player in 1960	
Pat Chaffey	1986, 1988–1989^{†}	NFL running back, 1991–1993	
Herman Clark	1949–1951^{†}	NFL player in 1952, 1954–1957	
Jim Clark	1949–1951^{†}	NFL player, 1952–1953	
Brandin Cooks		Wide receiver for the Los Angeles Rams	
José Cortéz	1997–1998^{†}	NFL placekicker, 1999–2006	
Rick Cunningham		NFL player in 1990, 1992–1998	
Herschel Currie	1992–1993^{†}	NFL cornerback in 1994	
Kyle DeVan	2004–2007^{†}	Offensive lineman for the Indianapolis Colts	
John Didion	1966–1968^{†}	NFL player, 1969–1974	
Ken Dow	1938–1940^{†}	NFL running back in 1941	
Don Durdan	1939–1941^{†}	All-America Football Conference player, 1946–1947	
Ron East	1964–1965^{†}	NFL defensive lineman, 1967–1973, 1975–1977	
Scott Eaton	1966^{†}	NFL player, 1967–1971	
Dwan Edwards	2000–2003^{†}	NFL defensive tackle for the Baltimore Ravens	
Keith Ellison	2004–2005^{†}	NFL linebacker for the Buffalo Bills	
Bill Enyart	1966–1968^{†}	AFL player in 1969; NFL player, 1970–1971	
David Etherly		NFL cornerback in 1987	
Tim Euhus	2000–2003^{†}	NFL tight end, 2004–2006	
Harry Field	1932–1933^{†}	NFL tackle, 1934–1936	
Roman Fortin	1985^{†}	NFL player, 1991–2000	
Joe Francis	1955–1957^{†}	NFL quarterback, 1958–1959	
Red Franklin	1932–1934^{†}	NFL running back, 1935–1937	
Rocky Freitas	1964, 1966^{†}	NFL offensive lineman, 1968–1978	
Jack Gotta	1951–1952^{†}	CFL tight end, 1957–1964; head coach of the Ottawa Rough Riders	
DeLawrence Grant	1999–2000^{†}	NFL defensive end, 2001–2005	
Bill Gray	1942–1946^{†}	NFL guard, 1947–1948	
Quentin Greenough	1940–1941^{†}	Former center for the Oregon State Beavers football team; 1941 All-American	
Bob Grim	1964–1966^{†}	NFL player, 1967–1977; one-time Pro Bowler	
Harry Gunner	1966–1967^{†}	AFL player, 1968–1969; NFL player in 1970	
Johnny Hackenbruck	1937–1939^{†}	NFL tackle in 1940	
Bill Halverson	1939–1941^{†}	NFL tackle in 1942	
Connor Hamlett	2010–2014	NFL tight end	
Craig Hanneman	1968–1970^{†}	NFL defensive lineman, 1972–1975	
Jeff Hart	1972–1974^{†}	NFL player, 1975–1976, 1979–1983	
Mike Hass	2002–2005^{†}	2005 Fred Biletnikoff Award winner, NFL receiver 2006–2010, and member of College Football Hall of Fame	
Armon Hatcher	1995–1998^{†}	NFL defensive back in 2000	
Johnny Hekker		NFL Punter, 2021 Super Bowl Champion, Pro Bowl (2014, 2016, 2017, 2018)	
Ron Heller	1981, 1983–1985^{†}	NFL tight end, 1987–1990, 1992	
Doug Hogland	1950–1952^{†}	NFL player, 1953–1958	
Bob Horn	1973–1975^{†}	NFL linebacker, 1976–1983	
Clark Hoss	1969–1971^{†}	NFL tight end in 1972	
T. J. Houshmandzadeh	1999–2000^{†}	NFL wide receiver for the Oakland Raiders and one-time Pro Bowler	
David Howard	1979^{†}	NFL linebacker, 1985–1992	
Brandon Hughes	2005–2008^{†}	Cornerback for the San Diego Chargers	
Hank Hughes	1928–1930^{†}	NFL player in 1932	
Jonathan Jackson	1996–1999^{†}	NFL linebacker in 2001	
LaDairis Jackson	1999–2000^{†}	NFL defensive end, 2002–2003	
Steven Jackson	2001–2003^{†}	NFL running back for the Atlanta Falcons; one-time Pro Bowler	
Chad Johnson		former NFL wide receiver/Pro Bowler	
Kerry Justin	1976–1977^{†}	NFL cornerback, 1978–1983, 1986–1987	
Alai Kalaniuvalu	1992–1993^{†}	NFL offensive lineman, 1994–1996	
Aaron Koch	1996–1999^{†}	NFL offensive lineman, 2000–2001	
Adam Koets	2003–2006^{†}	NFL offensive tackle for the New York Giants	
Elmer Kolberg	1935–1937^{†}	NFL player, 1939–1941	
Gerard Lawson	2004–2007^{†}	NFL cornerback	
James Lee	2001–2002^{†}	NFL defensive tackle in 2004 and current NFL Europa player for the Amsterdam Admirals	
Andy Levitre	2005–2008^{†}	Offensive lineman for the Buffalo Bills	
Keenan Lewis	2005–2008^{†}	Cornerback for the New Orleans Saints	
Paul Lowe	1956, 1958^{†}	AFL running back, 1960–1969; two-time AFL All-Star; 1965 AFL MVP; member of the AFL All-Time Team	
Dave Mann	1951^{†}	NFL running back, 1955–1957	
Sean Mannion		quarterback for the Minnesota Vikings	
Amos Marsh	1959–1960^{†}	NFL player, 1961–1967	
Frank Marsh	1960-1962	AFL defensive back in 1967	
Greg Marshall	1975–1977^{†}	NFL defensive tackle in 1978	
Pellom McDaniels	1987–1989^{†}	NFL defensive lineman, 1993–1999	
Bill McKalip	1928–1930^{†}	NFL player, 1932–1932, 1934, 1936	
Gabe Miller	2007–2010^{†}	NFL defensive end for the Kansas City Chiefs	
John Misko	1978^{†}	NFL punter, 1982–1984, 1987	
Harold Moe	1930–1932^{†}	NFL player in 1933	
Matt Moore	2005–2006^{†}	NFL quarterback for the Miami Dolphins	
Rob Nairne	1974–1976^{†}	NFL linebacker, 1977–1983	
Bill Nelson	1967–1969^{†}	NFL defensive tackle, 1971–1975	
Calvin Nicholson	1987–1988^{†}	NFL cornerback in 1989, 1991	
Doug Nienhuis	2001–2004^{†}	NFL tackle for the Denver Broncos	
Slade Norris	2005–2008^{†}	Linebacker for the Oakland Raiders	
Tom Oberg		AFL defensive back, 1968–1969	
Chad Ochocinco	2000^{†}	NFL wide receiver for the New England Patriots; five-time Pro Bowler	
Don Odegard	1985–1987^{†}	NFL cornerback, 1990–1991	
Ted Ossowski	1941–1942, 1946^{†}	AAFC tackle in 1947	
Stephen Paea	2008–2010^{†}	NFL defensive tackle for the Chicago Bears	
Hal Pangle	1932–1934^{†}	NFL player, 1935–1938	
Sam Paulescu	2004–2006^{†}	NFL punter	
Dainard Paulson	1958–1959^{†}	AFL defensive back, 1961–1966	
Joe Phillips	1982^{†}	NFL defensive lineman, 1986–1999	
Sabby Piscitelli	2003–2006^{†}	Safety for the Tampa Bay Buccaneers	
Jordan Poyer		NFL All-Pro Safety, Buffalo Bills	
Steve Preece	1966–1968^{†}	NFL defensive back, 1969–1977	
Hal Puddy	1945–1947^{†}	AAFC tackle in 1948	
Rocky Rasley	1967–1968^{†}	NFL guard, 1969–1970, 1972–1976	
Jarvis Redwine	1976^{†}	NFL running back, 1981–1983	
Terrell Roberts	1999–2002^{†}	NFL cornerback, 2003–2004	
Jacquizz Rodgers	2008–2010^{†}	NFL running back for the Atlanta Falcons	
Reggie Rust	1930–1931^{†}	NFL player in 1932	
Don Samuel	1946–1948^{†}	NFL running back, 1949–1950	
Roy Schuening	2004–2007^{†}	Offensive lineman for the Oakland Raiders	
Elbie Schultz	1937–1939^{†}	NFL player, 1940–1947	
Ade Schwammel	1931–1933^{†}	NFL player, 1934–1936, 1943–1944	
Lew Scott	1964–1965^{†}	AFL defensive back in 1966	
Vic Sears	1938–1940^{†}	NFL player, 1941–1943, 1945–1953; member of the NFL 1940s All-Decade Team	
Richard Seigler	2000–2003^{†}	NFL linebacker for the Pittsburgh Steelers	
Alexis Serna	2004—^{†}	2005 Lou Groza Award winner; placekicker for the Winnipeg Blue Bombers	
Ken Simonton	1998–2001^{†}	NFL running back in 2003	
Sammie Stroughter	2004–2008^{†}	Wide receiver for the Tampa Bay Buccaneers	
George Svendsen		NFL center, 1935–1937, 1940–1941; member of the NFL 1930s All-Decade Team	
Bill Swancutt	2001–2004^{†}	NFL defensive end for the Detroit Lions	
Aaron Thomas	1958–1960^{†}	NFL player, 1961–1970	
Robb Thomas	1985–1988^{†}	NFL wide receiver, 1989–1998	
Reggie Tongue	1992–1995^{†}	NFL defensive back, 1996–2005	
Esera Tuaolo	1987–1990^{†}	NFL defensive tackle, 1991–1999	
F. Wayne Valley	?–1936	Founder and principal owner of the Oakland Raiders; former President of the AFL	
Skip Vanderbundt	1965–1967^{†}	NFL linebacker, 1969–1978	
Dallas Ward	1924–1926^{†}	Former head coach of the Colorado Buffaloes football team	
Dennis Weathersby	1999–2002^{†}	NFL cornerback in 2003	
Markus Wheaton		wide receiver for the Chicago Bears	
Lloyd Wickett	1940–1942^{†}	NFL tackle in 1943, 1946	
Erik Wilhelm	1985–1988^{†}	NFL quarterback, 1989–1991, 1993–1994, 1996	
Jerry Wilkinson	1975–1978^{†}	NFL defensive end, 1979–1980	
Aric Williams	2001–2004^{†}	NFL Europa cornerback for the Cologne Centurions; Arena Football League player for the Philadelphia Soul	
Len Younce	1938–1940^{†}	NFL guard in 1941, 1943–1944, 1946–1948; member of the NFL 1940s All-Decade Team	

== Football coaching ==
Name	Attended	Notability	Reference
Rich Brooks^{‡}	1959–1964	1994 Paul "Bear" Bryant Award winner; 1996 Home Depot Coach of the Year; former Oregon State assistant coach; former head coach of the St. Louis Rams, the University of Oregon, and University of Kentucky	
Keith Heyward	1997–2000	Current co-defensive coordinator at University of Oregon	
Osia Lewis	?–1986^{†}	Current defensive coordinator for San Diego State University football	
Bronco Mendenhall^{‡}	1986–1987^{†}	Former Oregon State Beavers football assistant coach, former head football coach at Brigham Young University, current head football coach at University of Virginia	
Doug Sams	?–1978^{†}	Current offensive line coach at Stanford University	
Jonathan Smith	1998–2001^{†}	Former head coach at Oregon State University and Michigan State University	

== Mountaineering ==
Name	Attended	Notability	Reference
Stacy Allison	?–1984	First American woman to reach the summit of Mount Everest	
Willi Unsoeld	?–1951	Led the first United States climbing expedition to the summit of Mount Everest	

== Rowing ==
Name	Attended	Notability	Reference
Joseph Hansen	1999–2001^{†}	2004 Summer Olympics gold medalist in the men's eight with coxswain rowing event	
Josh Inman	1998–2003	2008 Summer Olympics bronze medalist in the men's eight with coxswain rowing event	
Amy Martin	?	2000 Summer Olympics competitor in the women's eight with coxswain rowing event	
Robert Zagunis	?-?	1976 Summer Olympics participant in men's rowing	

== Soccer ==
Name	Attended	Notability	Reference
Bella Bixby	2014–2017^{†}	National Women's Soccer League (NWSL) Portland Thorns FC and United States women's national soccer team goalkeeper	
Robbie Findley	2003–2006^{†}	Major League Soccer (MLS) striker for Real Salt Lake	
Alan Gordon	2002–2003^{†}	Major League Soccer (MLS) striker for the Los Angeles Galaxy	
Greg Howes	1998–1999^{†}	Major Indoor Soccer League striker for the Milwaukee Wave	
Ryan Johnson	2002–2005^{†}	Major League Soccer (MLS) striker for the Henan Jianye	
Danny Mwanga	2008–2009^{†}	Major League Soccer (MLS) striker for the Colorado Rapids	
Jodie Taylor	2004–2007^{†}	National Women's Soccer League (NWSL) striker for the Washington Spirit	
Courtney Wetzel	2007–2010^{†}	National Women's Soccer League (NWSL) midfielder for the Portland Thorns	

== Swimming and diving ==
Name	Attended	Notability	Reference
David Fall		1924 Summer Olympics silver medalist in high diving	
Louis Kuehn		1920 Summer Olympics gold medalist in springboard diving	
Clarence Pinkston		1920 Summer Olympics gold medalist in platform diving	
Tracy Smith		1968 U.S. Olympic team, 10,000 meters; world-record holder, 3-mile; 6-time AAU national champion	
Birte Steven		2004 Summer Olympics participant in the 200m breaststroke for the Germany national team; five-time NCAA All-American	

== Track and field ==
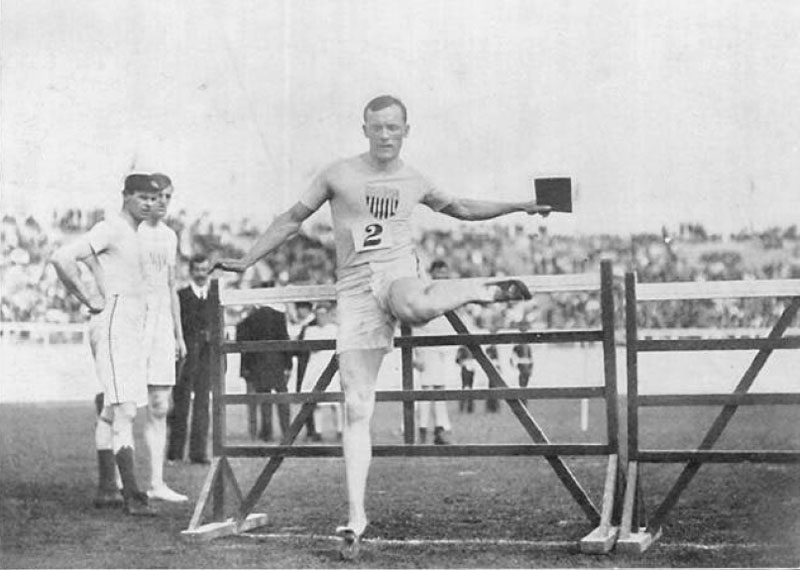
Forrest Smithson

Name	Attended	Notability	Reference
Dick Fosbury	?–1968	1968 Summer Olympics gold medalist in the high jump; creator of the Fosbury Flop	
Joni Huntley	?–1975	1984 Summer Olympics bronze medalist in the high jump	
Forrest Smithson	?–1908	1908 Summer Olympics gold medalist in the 110m hurdles	
Kathy Weston		1976 Summer Olympics participant	

== Winter sports ==
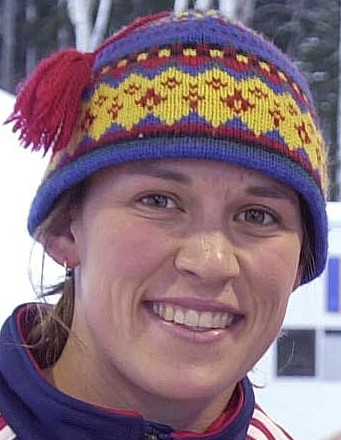
Jill Bakken

Name	Attended	Notability	Reference
Jill Bakken	1996	2002 Winter Olympics gold medalist in the two-woman bobsleigh	
Jean Saubert	?–1964	1964 Winter Olympics silver and bronze medalist in skiing	

== Wrestling ==
Name	Attended	Notability	Reference
Colby Covington		All-American and Pac-10 Champion; former UFC Interim Welterweight Champion, professional Mixed Martial Artist	
Nathan Coy		All-American wrestler; current mixed martial artist for Bellator Fighting Championship	
Les Gutches^{‡}	1993–1996^{†}	Two-time NCAA champion, 1998 Goodwill Games gold medal winner, the Freestyle World Champion at the 1997 World Championships, and United States 1996 Olympic wrestling Team member	
Jeff Monson	Attended^{†}	Wrestler; two-time gold medalist ('99 and '05), ADCC Submission Wrestling World Championships; current mixed martial artist, formerly for the Ultimate Fighting Championship	
Chester Newton	1926^{†}	1924 Summer Olympics silver medalist	
Robin Reed^{‡}	1923–1924^{†}	1924 Summer Olympics gold medalist; former head coach of the Oregon State Beavers wrestling team; National Wrestling Hall of Fame member	
Greg Strobel^{‡}	1971–1974^{†}	Two-time NCAA champion; current head wrestling coach at Lehigh University	
Oscar Wood		Three-time NCAA All-American; former Olympian	

== Multi-sport and other ==
Name	Attended	Notability	Reference
Jess Lewis	1966–1970^{†}	NFL linebacker in 1970 and NCAA heavyweight champion in wrestling in 1969 and 1970	
Howard Maple	1927–1929^{†}	NFL player in 1930 and MLB catcher in 1932	
Selina Scoble	?-?	2000 Summer Olympics participant with the USA women's volleyball team	

== Legend ==
^{†}	Only represents years in which individual was a letterman for one of the university's athletic teams; may have attended additional years
^{‡}	Individual is both an Oregon State University alumni and a current or former faculty member

== See also ==
- List of Oregon State University alumni
- List of Oregon State University faculty and staff
- List of people from Oregon
