= Leatherman (disambiguation) =

Leatherman is a trademark for a line of multitools produced by the Leatherman Tool Group.

Leatherman may also refer to:

== People ==
- Glenn Hughes, the biker character from the band Village People
- Hugh Leatherman (1931-2021), American politician
- Leatherman (vagabond), an individual in the nineteenth century traveling in Connecticut and New York state east of Hudson river
- Stephen Leatherman, a geological scientist at the Florida State University
- Timothy S. Leatherman, a businessman and the inventor of the multitool and brand

== Other uses ==
- A man involved with the leather subculture
- Leatherman Peak in Idaho's Lost River Range, the second highest named peak in the state
- "Leatherman", a Pearl Jam B-side released only on their 1998 single, "Given to Fly", about the 19th century vagabond in Northeastern United States.
