= List of All-Pac-12 Conference basketball teams =

List of All-Pac-12 Conference basketball teams may refer to:

- List of All-Pac-12 Conference men's basketball teams
- List of All-Pac-12 Conference women's basketball teams
