= Levenspiel plot =

Plot used in chemical reaction engineering

A Levenspiel plot is a plot used in chemical reaction engineering to determine the required volume of a chemical reactor given experimental data on the chemical reaction taking place in it. It is named after the late chemical engineering professor Octave Levenspiel.

== Derivation ==
For a continuous stirred-tank reactor (CSTR), the following relationship applies:

$V = F_{Ao} \left ( \frac{1} {-r_A} \right ) X$

where:

- $V$ is the reactor volume
- $F_{Ao}$ is the molar flow rate per unit time of the entering reactant A
- $X$ is the conversion of reactant A
- $-r_A$ is the rate of disappearance of reactant A per unit volume per unit time

For a plug flow reactor (PFR), the following relationship applies:

$V = F_{Ao} \int_0^X \frac{1} {-r_A} dX$

If $F_{Ao} \over -r_A$ is plotted as a function of $X$, the required volume to achieve a specific conversion can be determined given an entering molar flow rate.

The volume of a CSTR necessary to achieve a certain conversion at a given flow rate is equal to the area of the rectangle with height equal to $F_{Ao} \over -r_A$ and width equal to $X$.

The volume of a PFR necessary to achieve a certain conversion at a given flow rate is equal to the area under the curve of $F_{Ao} \over -r_A$ plotted against $X$.
