= Felecity Willis =

American basketball and softball player

Personal information
- Born: October 31, 1978 (age 48)
- Listed height: 5 ft 7 in (1.70 m)

Career information
- High school: Apple Valley (Apple Valley, California)
- College: Arizona (1996–2000)
- Playing career: 2000–2010
- Position: Guard

Career history
- 2002: Chicago Blaze
- 2006: Sundsvall DB
- 2008: Sundsvall Saints
- 2010: Montaneras De Morovis

Career highlights
- 4x BSN All-Star; 2x All Pac-10 (1999, 2000)

Felecity Willis (born October 31, 1978) is an American basketball referee and former player. She was a two-sport athlete for University of Arizona, playing college basketball and college softball for the Arizona Wildcats. She later played professional basketball for several years and was a member of the Puerto Rico national basketball team.

== Early life ==
Willis attended Apple Valley High School in Apple Valley, California, where she starred at basketball.

== College career ==
She played college basketball and softball in the United States with the University of Arizona Wildcats. She was a All-Pac-10 Conference player in 1999 and 2000.

== Professional career ==
Following her college career, Willis went on to play professionally. In 2002, she played for the Chicago Blaze of the NWBL. She also saw pre-season action in the WNBA, with the Los Angeles Sparks in 2000, the Charlotte Sting in 2001 and the Washington Mystics in 2003.

Willis has been a four-time All-star with the Criollas de Caguas women's BSN team. She has helped carry the Criollas to two consecutive finals, where they were upset both times by the Carolina Giants.

In January 2006, Willis joined the Sundsvall DB of the Swedish Basketligan dam, leading the club to the quarterfinal of the playoffs. She appeared in 13 games, averaging 18.2 points, 4.7 rebounds and 6.6 assists per game. Two years later, in March 2008, Willis rejoined Sundsvall, this time with the team in danger of relegation. She appeared in five games, including four straight victories, helping the club stave off relegation. In the five games, she averaged 17.2 points, 4.0 rebounds and 4.8 assists per game.

== National team career ==
Willis was a member of the Puerto Rican national team for six years, and played at the 2003 Central American and Caribbean Games in El Salvador, and in 2004 in Guatemala.

== Career statistics ==
Legend
GP	Games played	GS	Games started	MPG	Minutes per game	RPG	Rebounds per game
APG	Assists per game	SPG	Steals per game	BPG	Blocks per game	PPG	Points per game
TO	Turnovers per game	FG%	Field-goal percentage	3P%	3-point field-goal percentage	FT%	Free-throw percentage
**Bold**	Career best	°	League leader

=== College ===
Year	Team	GP	GS	MPG	FG%	3P%	FT%	RPG	APG	SPG	BPG	TO	PPG
1996–97	Arizona	31	-	-	34.4	21.7	66.0	1.7	3.0	1.2	0.1	-	5.0
1997–98	Arizona	30	-	-	47.6	29.7	68.8	2.1	4.0	1.5	0.1	-	7.0
1998–99	Arizona	29	-	-	**54.6**	**34.3**	**75.0**	**3.6**	**5.5**	**2.0**	**0.3**	-	**12.1**
1999–00	Arizona	**32**	-	-	46.3	32.6	68.1	2.6	5.3	1.5	0.2	-	7.8
**Career**		122	-	-	46.8	28.3	70.1	2.5	4.4	1.5	0.2	-	7.9
Statistics retrieved from Sports-Reference.

== Later life ==
Following her playing career, Willis went into officiating. In 2010, she attended officiating training camp run by NCAA referee Bob Scofield at Flowing Wells High School. By 2013, she was officiating NCAA Division I Women's games. In 2018 she was appointed a referee in the Pac-12 Conference.
