= Camille LeNoir =

American former professional basketball player

Personal information
- Born: September 1, 1986 (age 40) Inglewood, California, U.S.
- Listed height: 5 ft 6 in (1.68 m)

Career information
- High school: Narbonne (Harbor City, California)
- College: USC
- WNBA draft: 2009: 2nd round, 23rd overall pick
- Drafted by: Washington Mystics
- Position: Guard

Career history
- 2009–2011: AS Aris Thessaloniki

Career highlights
- First-team All Pac-10 (2009); Third-team All Pac-10 (2008)
- Stats at Basketball Reference

Camille LeNoir (born September 1, 1986) is an American former professional basketball player. She played college basketball at University of Southern California (USC).

== High school ==
LeNoir attended Narbonne High School. In 2014, she had her jersey retired by the school.

== College statistics ==
| Season | G | FGM | FGA | PCT | FTM | FTA | PCT | 3PM | 3PA | PCT | REB | AST | STL | BL | PTS | AVG |
|---|---|---|---|---|---|---|---|---|---|---|---|---|---|---|---|---|
| 2004–05 | 31 | 101 | 281 | .359 | 41 | 55 | .745 | 28 | 93 | .301 | 66 | 100 | 43 | 6 | 271 | 8.70 |
| 2005–06 | 31 | 146 | 372 | .392 | 57 | 75 | .760 | 46 | 135 | .341 | 66 | 127 | 35 | 4 | 395 | 12.7 |
| 2007–08 | 28 | 123 | 337 | .365 | 21 | 32 | .656 | 40 | 135 | .296 | 73 | 113 | 55 | 2 | 307 | 11.0 |
| 2008–09 | 32 | 152 | 364 | .418 | 79 | 101 | .782 | 40 | 100 | .396 | 82 | 126 | 51 | 0 | 423 | 13.2 |
| Totals | 122 | 522 | 1354 | .386 | 198 | 263 | .753 | 154 | 464 | .332 | 287 | 466 | 184 | 12 | 1396 | 11.4 |

== Personal life ==
LeNoir graduated from USC with a B.A. in Sociology. In 2010 she founded True Point Guard, a basketball training company in Los Angeles.
