= Shawntinice Polk =

American basketball player (1983-2005)

Personal information
- Born: March 27, 1983
- Died: September 26, 2005 (aged 22) Tucson, Arizona, U.S.
- Listed height: 6 ft 5 in (1.96 m)
- Listed weight: 225 lb (102 kg)

Career information
- High school: Hanford (Hanford, California)
- College: Arizona (2001–2005)
- Position: Center

Career highlights
- Parade All-American (2001); 3x All Pac-10 (2003–2005); Pac-10 Freshman of the Year (2003); Pac-10 All-Freshman Team (2003)

Shawntinice Polk (March 27, 1983 – September 26, 2005) was an American women's basketball player who played at the University of Arizona.

== Career ==
Despite playing only three seasons, she ranks fourth on the school's all time chart for points scored with 1,467 points. She has also compiled 914 rebounds, 222 blocks, 220 assists, 145 steals, and a 57.3 field goal percentage.

=== Arizona statistics ===
Legend
GP	Games played	GS	Games started	MPG	Minutes per game
FG%	Field goal percentage	3P%	3-point field goal percentage	FT%	Free throw percentage
RPG	Rebounds per game	APG	Assists per game	SPG	Steals per game
BPG	Blocks per game	PPG	Points per game	**Bold**	Career high

Year	Team	GP	Points	FG%	3P%	FT%	RPG	APG	SPG	BPG	PPG
2002-03	Arizona	31	538	**60.9%**	0.0%	59.6%	**10.8**	**2.6**	**1.7**	**2.6**	**17.4**
2003-04	Arizona	**33**	**549**	57.4%	0.0%	52.4%	10.3	2.3	1.6	2.4	16.6
2004-05	Arizona	30	380	52.9%	0.0%	**60.2%**	8.0	2.1	1.3	2.1	12.7
Career		94	1467	57.3%	0.0%	57.0%	9.7	2.3	1.5	2.4	15.6

== Death ==
Shawntinice Polk died suddenly on the morning of September 26, 2005 when a pulmonary blood clot lodged (pulmonary embolism) in one of her lungs. It was a rare fatal occurrence for a healthy woman of her age. Polk is survived by her mother, Johnny Little, four older brothers and two older sisters. She was only 22 years old.

== High school career ==
- Attended Hanford High School in Hanford, California, where she was a four-year letterwinner in both basketball and volleyball.
- Named a 2001 All-America first team by WBCA, Parade Magazine and USA Today.
- Participated in the 2001 WBCA High School All-America Game where she scored eight points.
- Recorded 2,163 points, 1,326 rebounds and 384 blocks, while leading Hanford to a 119-13 overall record during her high school career.
- A three-time CIF All-Central Section honoree.
- A four-time all-conference, all-city and all-county selection.
- Averaged 16.1 ppg., 13.1 rpg. and 4.1 bpg. as a senior, while leading Hanford to a 31-2 record and the CIF Division II state championship.
- Earned all-league honors in volleyball.

== College career ==
- Named WBCA All-America honorable mention in 2003, 2004 and 2005.
- Three-time All-Pacific-10 Conference first team in 2003, 2004 and 2005.
- Named to the 2005 Kodak All-Region 8 team
- Two-time Associated Press All-America honorable mention in 2003 and 2004.
- Named WBCA Player of the Month for Feb. 2004.
- Three-time Pac-10 Player of the Week in 2004 and four-time Pac-10 Player of the Week in 2003.
- Named the 2003 Pac-10 Freshman of the Year.
- Selected 2003 All-Pac-10 and to the 2003 Pac-10 All-Freshmen Team.
- Selected to the Freshmen All-America first team by Full Court Press and WomensCollegeHoops.com in 2003.
- Named the MVP at the 2002 Fiesta Bowl Classic, averaged 20.5 ppg. and 13.5 rpg.
- Named by Sports Illustrated as one of five collegiate women who are "Elevating the Game" (1/20/03).
- Holds Career School Records for Blocked Shots (222), Double Doubles (46), and Rebounding Average (9.7 per game).
