= Victor Arviel Madsen =

American physicist and professor

- Born: Idaho Falls, Idaho
- Died: July 24, 2008 (aged 77); Corvallis, Oregon
- Education: Gonzaga University; University of Washington
- Awards: Fellow, American Physical Society; Sigma XI member
- Scientific career
- Fields: Theoretical nuclear physics
- Workplaces: Case Institute of Technology; Oregon State University

Victor Arviel Madsen (1931–2008) was a researcher in theoretical nuclear physics, and a dedicated Emeritus faculty member of Oregon State University in Corvallis. He was named a 1964 member of Sigma XI, and a 1984 Fellow of the American Physical Society.

== Personal life and education ==
The son of Joseph and June Madsen, Victor Arviel Madsen was born in Idaho Falls, Idaho in 1931. His family moved to Spokane in 1946, where he served as student body president during his senior year at West Valley High School.

Madsen studied for two years at Gonzaga University before transferring to the University of Washington to earn a bachelor of science in 1953 and a doctorate in physics in 1961. His dissertation was titled, Photoemission and Radiative Capture of Deuterons.

Madsen married Virginia Ruth Harrill in 1955, and they had two children, Lisa and John. After they divorced, Madsen married Carolyn Wipf Shirkey in Corvallis in 1985.

Madsen had many interests and activities beyond his research life, including classical music, healthful living, travel, "making multi-lingual puns, silly use of words, and rewording popular songs to fit given situations. He played with a recorder group for many years, enjoying both the music and the camaraderie of the musicians." In addition, "...he became an accomplished cook, making it possible for him to host many dinner parties at his home during the years while he was single."

== Career ==
Beginning in 1961, Madsen worked as post-graduate research associate at Case Institute of Technology for two years, and during summers, he worked at NASA in Cleveland.

In July 1963, the Oregon State Board of Higher Education hired Madsen as an assistant professor at Oregon State University. Madsen served as one of two nuclear theoreticians in the University's Low Energy Physics Group, working on upgrades to the university's cyclotron in 1965. He became tenured in 1966, and presented a paper in 1967 at the American Physical Society's meeting in Corvallis.

Madsen had a year of study and research in Denmark at the Niels Bohr Institute, and secured a $22,500 NSF grant from the National Science Foundation in 1971, "for research concerned with nuclear forces in nuclei and nuclear-reaction mechanisms." Madsen said, "By comparing computer calculations done using the methods of quantum theory with nuclear-reaction data from many laboratories, one can obtain information about nuclear forces and the structure of the nucleus."

Madsen was a named a 1984 Fellow of the American Physical Society's Division of Nuclear Physics, cited For his continuous efforts in furthering our understanding of nuclear reaction and their use in probing nuclear structure.

In 1991, Madsen submitted a report of his research activities to the U.S. Department of Energy, which included topic categories of "Imaginary Optical Potential," "Isospin Effects," "Scattering and Charge Exchange Reactions," and "Pairing Effects."

Madsen retired from his OSU faculty position in 1998. He was diagnosed with Alzheimer's disease in 2006, and died of its effects in 2008.

== Selected publications ==
=== Books ===
Kloepper, Robert M.; Madsen, Victor A. (1956). Sensitivity of a Compton Detector. Los Alamos Scientific Laboratory of the University of California.

=== Articles ===
- Madsen, V. A. (May 1966). "A formalism for direct inelastic scattering and charge exchange". Nuclear Physics. 80 (1): 177–197. Bibcode:1966NucPh..80..177M. doi:10.1016/0029-5582(66)90835-2 – via Elsevier Science Direct.
- Petrovich, F.; McManus, H.; Madsen, V. A.; Atkinson, J. (1969-04-28). "Finite-Nucleus G Matrix in the Microscopic Description of Inelastic Proton Scattering". Physical Review Letters. 22 (17). American Physical Society: 895–899. Bibcode:1969PhRvL..22..895P. doi:10.1103/PhysRevLett.22.895.
- Brown, V. R.; Madsen, V. A. (1975-04-01). "Core polarization in inelastic scattering and effective charges". Physical Review C. 11 (4). American Physical Society: 1298–1311. Bibcode:1975PhRvC..11.1298B. doi:10.1103/PhysRevC.11.1298.
- Madsen, V. A.; Brown, V. R.; Grimes, S. M.; Poppe, C. H.; Anderson, J. D.; Davis, J. C.; Wong, C. (1976-02-01). "Effect of inelastic coupling on 0+ analog transitions". Physical Review C. 13 (2). American Physical Society: 548–555. doi:10.1103/PhysRevC.13.548.
- Bernstein, Aron M.; Brown, V. R.; Madsen, V. A. (1979-02-12). "Isospin Decomposition of Nuclear Multipole Matrix Elements from gamm Decay Rates of Mirror Transitions: Test of Values Obtained with Hadronic Probes". Physical Review Letters. 42 (7). American Physical Society: 425–428. doi:10.1103/PhysRevLett.42.425.
- Madsen, V. A. (1981-03-01). Nuclear transmission coefficients for calculation of the absorption cross section in the adiabatic coupled-channel approximation method (Report). Lawrence Livermore National Lab., CA (USA). doi:10.2172/6451432. OSTI 6451432.
- Bernstein, A.M.; Brown, V.R.; Madsen, V.A. (Jul 1981). "Neutron and proton transition matrix elements and inelastic hadron scattering". Physics Letters B. 103 (4–5): 255–258. Bibcode:1981PhLB..103..255B. doi:10.1016/0370-2693(81)90219-7. ISSN 0370-2693. Archived from the original on 2023-06-30.
- Brown, B. A.; Wildenthal, B. H.; Chung, W.; Massen, S. E.; Bernas, M.; Bernstein, A. M.; Miskimen, R.; Brown, V. R.; Madsen, V. A. (1982-11-01). "Isovector 𝐸⁢2 matrix elements from electromagnetic transitions in the 𝑠 −𝑑 shell: Experiment and shell-model calculations". Physical Review C. 26 (5). American Physical Society: 2247–2272. doi:10.1103/PhysRevC.26.2247.
- Bernstein, A. M.; Brown, V. R.; Madsen, V. A. (May 1983). "Neutron and proton matrix elements for low-lying 2+ transitions and the probe dependence of the nuclear deformation parameter". Comments Nuclear Particle Physics. 11 (5): 203–215. ISSN 0010-2709.
- Landau, R. H.; Madsen, V. A.; Oregon State Univ., Corvallis; Landau, R. H.; Madsen, V. A.; Oregon State Univ., Corvallis (1996). Theoretical studies in nuclear physics. Three year progress report and final report (Report). Oregon State Univ., Corvallis, OR (United States).

== Awards, honors ==
- 1964 Sigma XI membership
- 1984 Fellow of the American Physical Society
- 1985 Milton Harris Award in Basic Research, Oregon State University

== See also ==
- List of Oregon State University Faculty and Staff
