= List of All-Pac-12 Conference women's basketball teams =

The All-Pac-12 Women's basketball team is a currently dormant annual Pac-12 Conference honor bestowed on the best players in the conference following every college basketball season. Pac-12 coaches select 15 players for one all-conference team. The first year 1986-87, the conference recognized players as two five-woman teams, followed by one 12-woman first team from 1987 through 2007. For two years in 2008 & 2009, there were three five-woman teams selected.

On the last day of the conference regular season, Pac-12 coaches submit their votes and are allowed to vote for their own players. Each all-conference team member receives an award. Players who are not placed on the team, but received at least one vote, earn honorable mention.

The award fell dormant after the 2023–24 season when the Pac-12 collapsed, with 10 of the 12 members (all but Oregon State and Washington State) leaving for other power conferences. With the two current members set to be joined by at least six new members in July 2026, the award will be reinstated in the 2026–27 season.

== Selections ==
*	Named Pac-12 Player of the Year that season. Awarded since 1987.
†	Named co-Pac-12 Players of the Year that season.

=== 1987–1989 ===
Season	First team		Second team		Ref
Season	Players	Teams	Players	Teams	Ref
1986–87	Jennifer Bennett	California	Yvette Cole	Washington	
1986–87	Lauri Landerholm*	Oregon	Monica Lamb	USC	
1986–87	Rhonda Windham	USC	Gabi Neumann	Oregon	
1986–87	Dora Dome	UCLA	Lisa Oriard	Washington	
1986–87	Cherie Nelson	USC	Dana Patterson	Arizona	

Season	First team				Ref
Season	Players	Teams	Players	Teams	Ref
1987–88	Jennifer Azzi	Stanford	Stefanie Kasperski	Oregon	
1987–88	Yvette Cole	Washington	Shamona Mosley	Arizona State	
1987–88	Dora Dome	UCLA	Cherie Nelson*	USC	
1987–88	Chelle Flamoe	Oregon State	Lisa Oriard	Washington	
1987–88	Jonni Gray	Washington State	Dana Patterson	Arizona	
1987–88	Karon Howell	USC	Katy Steding	Stanford	
1988–89	Jennifer Azzi*	Stanford	Sonja Henning	Stanford	
1988–89	Yvette Cole	Washington	Stefanie Kasperski	Oregon	
1988–89	Chelle Flamoe	Oregon State	Cherie Nelson	USC	
1988–89	Amy Gamble	Arizona	Katy Steding	Stanford	
1988–89	Jonni Gray	Washington State	Sandra VanEmbricqs	UCLA	

=== 1990–1999 ===
Season	First team				Ref
Season	Players	Teams	Players	Teams	Ref
1989–90	Jennifer Azzi*	Stanford	Angie Miller	Washington State	
1989–90	Karen Deden	Washington	Katy Steding	Stanford	
1989–90	Sonja Henning	Stanford	Rehema Stephens	UCLA	
1989–90	Stefanie Kasperski	Oregon	Trisha Stevens	Stanford	
1989–90	Amy Mickelson	Washington	Sandra VanEmbricqs	UCLA	
1990–91	Karen Deden	Washington	Trisha Stafford	California	
1990–91	Sonja Henning*	Stanford	Rehema Stephens	UCLA	
1990–91	Lisa Leslie	USC	Trisha Stevens	Stanford	
1990–91	Laurie Merlino	Washington	Tamy Story	USC	
1990–91	Judy Shannon	Oregon State	Julie Zeilstra	Stanford	
1991–92	Ryneldi Becenti	Arizona State	Rehema Stephens	UCLA	
1991–92	Margo Clark	Arizona	Tamy Story	USC	
1991–92	Lisa Leslie	USC	Val Whiting*	Stanford	
1991–92	Judy Shannon	Oregon State	Natalie Williams	UCLA	
1991–92	Trisha Stafford	California	Milica Vukadinovic	California	
1992–93	Nicole Anderson	UCLA	Lisa Leslie	USC	
1992–93	Ryneldi Becenti	Arizona State	Rhonda Smith	Washington	
1992–93	Joni Easterly	USC	Milica Vukadinovic	California	
1992–93	Molly Goodenbour	Stanford	Val Whiting*	Stanford	
1992–93	Tanja Kostic	Oregon State	Natalie Williams	UCLA	
1993–94	Tara Davis	Washington	Lisa Leslie	USC	
1993–94	Christy Hedgpeth	Stanford	Nicky McCrimmon	USC	
1993–94	Rachel Hemmer	Stanford	Rhonda Smith	Washington	
1993–94	Anita Kaplan	Stanford	Debbie Sporcich	Oregon	
1993–94	Tanja Kostic	Oregon State	Natalie Williams*	UCLA	
1994–95	Sally Crowe	Oregon	Rhonda Smith	Washington	
1994–95	Renae Fegent	Oregon	Eliza Sokolowska	California	
1994–95	Kisa Hughes	UCLA	Kate Starbird	Stanford	
1994–95	Anita Kaplan	Stanford	Tina Thompson	USC	
1994–95	Tanja Kostic*	Oregon State	Boky Vidic	Oregon State	
1995–96	Adia Barnes	Arizona	Brenda Pantoja	Arizona	
1995–96	Arianne Boyer	Oregon	Jenni Ruff	Washington State	
1995–96	Renae Fegent	Oregon	Kate Starbird*	Stanford	
1995–96	Nickey Hilbert	UCLA	Tina Thompson	USC	
1995–96	Tanja Kostic*	Oregon State	Jamila Wideman	Stanford	
1996–97	Adia Barnes	Arizona	Jamie Redd	Washington	
1996–97	Arianne Boyer	Oregon	Olympia Scott	Stanford	
1996–97	Jade Hyett	Washington State	Kate Starbird*	Stanford	
1996–97	Tina Lelas	Oregon State	Tina Thompson	USC	
1996–97	Maylana Martin	UCLA	Jamila Wideman	Stanford	
1997–98	Adia Barnes*	Arizona	Natalie Hughes	Oregon	
1997–98	Kristin Clark	USC	Maylana Martin	UCLA	
1997–98	Kristin Folkl	Stanford	Vanessa Nygaard	Stanford	
1997–98	Erica Gomez	UCLA	Jamie Redd	Washington	
1997–98	Amber Hall	Washington	Olympia Scott	Stanford	
1998–99	LaCresha Flannigan	UCLA	Maylana Martin*	UCLA	
1998–99	Milena Flores	Stanford	Jamie Redd	Washington	
1998–99	Erica Gomez	UCLA	Adrain Williams	USC	
1998–99	Amber Hall	UCLA	Shaquala Williams	Oregon	
1998–99	Angela Lackey	Arizona	Felecity Willis	Arizona	
1998–99	Tricia Lamb	Washington State	N/A	N/A	

=== 2000–2009 ===
Season	First team				Ref
Season	Players	Teams	Players	Teams	Ref
1999–00	Tatum Brown	Arizona	Sissel Pierce	Oregon State	
1999–00	Milena Flores	Stanford	Felicia Ragland	Oregon State	
1999–00	Megan Franza	Washington	Shaquala Williams*	Oregon	
1999–00	Rachel Holt	Arizona State	Felecity Willis	Arizona	
1999–00	Maylana Martin	UCLA	Angelina Wolvert	Oregon	
2000–01	Reshea Bristol	Arizona	Amanda Levens	Arizona State	
2000–01	Megan Franza	Washington	Elizabeth Pickney	Arizona	
2000–01	Michelle Greco	UCLA	Nicole Powell	Stanford	
2000–01	Courtney Johnson	California	Felicia Ragland	Oregon State	
2000–01	Melody Johnson	Arizona State	Angelina Wolvert	Oregon	
2001–02	Ebony Hoffman	USC	Elizabeth Pickney	Arizona	
2001–02	Aisha Hollans	USC	Nicole Powell*	Stanford	
2001–02	Amanda Levens	Arizona State	Felicia Ragland	Oregon State	
2001–02	Giuliana Mendiola	Washington	Shaquala Williams	Oregon	
2001–02	Loree Payne	Washington	Lindsey Yamasaki	Stanford	
2002–03	Nikki Blue	UCLA	Giuliana Mendiola*	Washington	
2002–03	Leilani Estavan	Oregon State	Shawntinice Polk	Arizona	
2002–03	Michelle Greco	UCLA	Nicole Powell	Stanford	
2002–03	Ebony Hoffman	USC	Kelley Suminski	Stanford	
2002–03	Loree Payne	Washington	Dee-Dee Wheeler	Arizona	
2003–04	Nihan Anaz	California	Giuliana Mendiola	Washington	
2003–04	Nikki Blue	UCLA	Shawntinice Polk	Arizona	
2003–04	Ebony Hoffman	USC	Nicole Powell	Stanford	
2003–04	Andrea Lalum	Washington	Noelle Quinn	UCLA	
2003–04	Kylan Loney	Arizona State	Dee-Dee Wheeler	Arizona	
2004–05	Andrea Bills	Oregon	Kelley Suminski	Stanford	
2004–05	Nikki Blue	UCLA	Emily Westerberg	Arizona State	
2004–05	Cathrine Kraayeveld	Oregon	Dee-Dee Wheeler	Arizona	
2004–05	Shawntinice Polk	Arizona	Candice Wiggins*	Stanford	
2004–05	Brooke Smith	Stanford	Lisa Willis	UCLA	
2005–06	Nikki Blue	UCLA	Noelle Quinn	UCLA	
2005–06	Devanei Hampton	California	Brooke Smith	Stanford	
2005–06	Cameo Hicks	Washington	Emily Westerberg	Arizona State	
2005–06	Kristen Kovesdy	Arizona State	Candice Wiggins	Stanford	
2005–06	Eshaya Murphy	USC	Lisa Willis	UCLA	
2006–07	Devanei Hampton*	California	Noelle Quinn	UCLA	
2006–07	Cameo Hicks	Washington	Brooke Smith	Stanford	
2006–07	Aubree Johnson	Arizona State	Ashley Walker	California	
2006–07	Eshaya Murphy	USC	Emily Westerberg	Arizona State	
2006–07	Casey Nash	Oregon State	Candice Wiggins	Stanford	

Season	First team		Second team		Third team		Ref
Season	Players	Teams	Players	Teams	Players	Teams	Ref
2007–08	Jayne Appel	Stanford	Alexis Gray-Lawson	California	Emily Florence	Washington	
2007–08	Devanei Hampton	California	Briann January	Arizona State	Mercedes Fox-Griffin	Oregon State	
2007–08	Lindsey Pluimer	UCLA	Lauren Lacey	Arizona State	Camille LeNoir	USC	
2007–08	Ashley Walker	California	Nadia Parker	USC	Taylor Lilley	Oregon	
2007–08	Candice Wiggins*	Stanford	Ashley Whisonant	Arizona	Kayla Pedersen	Stanford	

Season	First team				Second team		Ref
Season	Players	Teams	Players	Teams	Players	Teams	Ref
2008–09	Jayne Appel*	Stanford	Doreena Campbell	UCLA	Brittney Davis	Oregon State	
2008–09	Alexis Gray-Lawson	California	Jillian Harmon	Stanford	Micaela Cocks	Oregon	
2008–09	Ify Ibekwe	Arizona	Camille LeNoir	USC	Briana Gilbreath	USC	
2008–09	Briann January	Arizona State	Jeanette Pohlen	Stanford	Devanei Hampton	California	
2008–09	Ashley Walker	California	Dymond Simon	Arizona State	Kayla Pedersen	Stanford	

=== 2010–2019 ===
Season	First team						Ref
Season	Players	Teams	Players	Teams	Players	Teams	Ref
2009–10	Jayne Appel	Stanford	Briana Gilbreath	USC	Kayla Pedersen	Stanford	
2009–10	Doreena Campbell	UCLA	Alexis Gray-Lawson	California	Jeanette Pohlen	Stanford	
2009–10	Micaela Cocks	Oregon	Ify Ibekwe	Arizona	Danielle Orsillo	Arizona State	
2009–10	Ashley Corral	USC	Taylor Lilley	Oregon	Sami Whitcomb	Washington	
2009–10	Jasmine Dixon	UCLA	Nnemkadi Ogwumike*	Stanford	Davellyn Whyte	Arizona	
2010–11	Doreena Campbell	UCLA	Nia Jackson	Oregon	Kayla Pedersen	Stanford	
2010–11	Ashley Corral	USC	Kristi Kingma	Washington	Jeanette Pohlen*	Stanford	
2010–11	Jasmine Dixon	UCLA	Darxia Morris	UCLA	Dymond Simon	Arizona State	
2010–11	Briana Gilbreath	USC	Chiney Ogwumike	Stanford	DeNesha Stallworth	California	
2010–11	Ify Ibekwe	Arizona	Nnemkadi Ogwumike	Stanford	Davellyn Whyte	Arizona	
2011–12	Jazmine Davis	Washington	Chucky Jeffrey	Colorado	Nnemkadi Ogwumike*	Stanford	
2011–12	Layshia Clarendon	California	Amanda Johnson	Oregon	Regina Rogers	Washington	
2011–12	Ashley Corral	USC	Toni Kokenis	Stanford	Markel Walker	UCLA	
2011–12	Rebekah Gardner	UCLA	Earlysia Marchbanks	Oregon State	Davellyn Whyte	Arizona	
2011–12	Briana Gilbreath	USC	Chiney Ogwumike	Stanford	Taryn Wicijowski	Utah	
2012–13	Brittany Boyd	California	Cassie Harberts	USC	Amber Orrange	Stanford	
2012–13	Gennifer Brandon	California	Chucky Jeffrey	Colorado	Michelle Plouffe	Utah	
2012–13	Alyssia Brewer	UCLA	Kristi Kingma	Washington	Joslyn Tinkle	Stanford	
2012–13	Layshia Clarendon	California	Atonye Nyingifa	UCLA	Markel Walker	UCLA	
2012–13	Jazmine Davis	Washington	Chiney Ogwumike*	Stanford	Davellyn Whyte	Arizona	
2013–14	Jillian Alleyne	Oregon	Reshanda Gray	California	Amber Orrange	Stanford	
2013–14	Brittany Boyd	California	Cassie Harberts	USC	Michelle Plouffe	Utah	
2013–14	Jazmine Davis	Washington	Deja Mann	Arizona State	Kelsey Plum	Washington	
2013–14	Nirra Fields	UCLA	Atonye Nyingifa	UCLA	Tia Presley	Washington State	
2013–14	Lia Galdeira	Washington State	Chiney Ogwumike*	Stanford	Sydney Wiese	Oregon State	
2014–15	Jillian Alleyne	Oregon	Nirra Fields	UCLA	Kelsey Plum	Washington	
2014–15	Promise Amukamara	Arizona State	Lia Galdeira	Washington State	Lili Thompson	Stanford	
2014–15	Brittany Boyd	California	Reshanda Gray*	California	Alexyz Vaioletama	USC	
2014–15	Sophie Brunner	Arizona State	Ruth Hamblin	Oregon State	Jamie Weisner	Oregon State	
2014–15	Jazmine Davis	Washington	Amber Orrange	Stanford	Sydney Wiese	Oregon State	
2015–16	Jillian Alleyne	Oregon	Temi Fagbenle	USC	Kelsey Plum	Washington	
2015–16	Kristine Anigwe	California	Nirra Fields	UCLA	Emily Potter	Utah	
2015–16	Sophie Brunner	Arizona State	Ruth Hamblin	Oregon State	Lili Thompson	Stanford	
2015–16	Jordin Canada	UCLA	Katie Hempen	Arizona State	Jamie Weisner*	Oregon State	
2015–16	Elisha Davis	Arizona State	Erica McCall	Stanford	Sydney Wiese	Oregon State	
2016–17	Kristine Anigwe	California	Marie Gülich	Oregon State	Chantel Osahor	Washington	
2016–17	Monique Billings	UCLA	Sabrina Ionescu	Oregon	Kelsey Plum*	Washington	
2016–17	Sophie Brunner	Arizona State	Kennedy Leonard	Colorado	Karlie Samuelson	Stanford	
2016–17	Jordin Canada	UCLA	Erica McCall	Stanford	Kristen Simon	USC	
2016–17	Ruthy Hebard	Oregon	Brittany McPhee	Stanford	Sydney Wiese	Oregon State	
2017–18	Kristine Anigwe	California	Ruthy Hebard	Oregon	Kennedy Leonard	Colorado	
2017–18	Monique Billings	UCLA	Borislava Hristova	Washington State	Brittany McPhee	Stanford	
2017–18	Jordin Canada	UCLA	Megan Huff	Utah	Amber Melgoza	Washington	
2017–18	Maite Cazorla	Oregon	Kianna Ibis	Arizona State	Kristen Simon	USC	
2017–18	Marie Gülich	Oregon State	Sabrina Ionescu*	Oregon	Alanna Smith	Stanford	
2018–19	Kristine Anigwe	California	Megan Huff	Utah	Mikayla Pivec	UCLA	
2018–19	Maite Cazorla	Oregon	Kianna Ibis	Arizona State	Satou Sabally	Oregon	
2018–19	DiJonai Carrington	Stanford	Sabrina Ionescu*	Oregon	Destiny Slocum	Oregon State	
2018–19	Ruthy Hebard	Oregon	Aari McDonald	Arizona	Alanna Smith	Stanford	
2018–19	Borislava Hristova	Washington State	Michaela Onyenwere	UCLA	Kiana Williams	Stanford	

=== 2020–present ===
Season	First team						Ref
Season	Players	Teams	Players	Teams	Players	Teams	Ref
2019–20	Kristine Anigwe	California	Aari McDonald	Arizona	Cate Reese	Arizona	
2019–20	Ruthy Hebard	Oregon	Amber Melgoza	Washington	Robbi Ryan	Arizona State	
2019–20	Borislava Hristova	Washington State	Michaela Onyenwere	UCLA	Satou Sabally	Oregon	
2019–20	Lexie Hull	Stanford	Alissa Pili	USC	Destiny Slocum	Oregon State	
2019–20	Sabrina Ionescu*	Oregon	Mikayla Pivec	Oregon State	Kiana Williams	Stanford	
2020–21	Aleah Goodman	Oregon State	Charlisse Leger-Walker	Washington State	Cate Reese	Arizona	
2020–21	Mya Hollingshed	Colorado	Aari McDonald*	Arizona	Endyia Rogers	USC	
2020–21	Lexie Hull	Stanford	Michaela Onyenwere	UCLA	Nyara Sabally	Oregon	
2020–21	Haley Jones	Stanford	Charisma Osborne	UCLA	Sam Thomas	Arizona	
2020–21	Taylor Jones	Oregon State	Te-Hina Paopao	Oregon	Kiana Williams	Stanford	
2021–22	Cameron Brink	Stanford	Gianna Kneepkens	Utah	Cate Reese	Arizona	
2021–22	Mya Hollingshed	Colorado	Charlisse Leger-Walker	Washington State	Endyia Rogers	USC	
2021–22	Lexie Hull	Stanford	Jade Loville	Arizona State	Nyara Sabally	Oregon	
2021–22	Jordyn Jenkins	USC	Charisma Osborne	UCLA	IImar'I Thomas	UCLA	
2021–22	Haley Jones*	Stanford	Te-Hina Paopao	Oregon	Talia von Oelhoffen	Oregon State	
2022–23	Raegan Beers	Oregon State	Destiny Littleton	USC	Cate Reese	Arizona	
2022–23	Cameron Brink	Stanford	Rayah Marshall	USC	Endyia Rogers	Oregon	
2022–23	Haley Jones	Stanford	Quay Miller	Colorado	Jaylyn Sherrod	Colorado	
2022–23	Hannah Jump	Stanford	Charisma Osborne	UCLA	Kadi Sissoko	USC	
2022–23	Gianna Kneepkens	Utah	Shaina Pellington	Arizona			
2022–23	Charlisse Leger-Walker	Washington State	Alissa Pili*	Utah			
2023–24	Raegan Beers	Oregon State	Kiki Iriafen	Stanford	Kiki Rice	UCLA	
2023–24	Lauren Betts	UCLA	Charlisse Leger-Walker	Washington State	Jaylyn Sherrod	Colorado	
2023–24	Cameron Brink*	Stanford	Charisma Osborne	UCLA	Talia von Oelhoffen	Oregon State	
2023–24	McKenzie Forbes	USC	Alissa Pili	Utah	Aaronette Vonleh	Colorado	
2023–24	Timea Gardiner	Oregon State	Helena Pueyo	Arizona	JuJu Watkins	USC	

== See also ==
- List of All-Pac-12 Conference men's basketball teams
