= Anthony E. Van Dyke =

American colonel

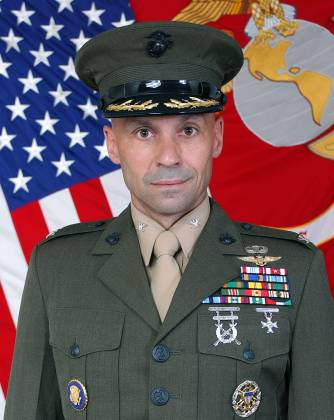
- Colonel A. E. Van Dyke
- Born: Forest Grove, Oregon
- Military career
- Allegiance: United States of America
- Branch: United States Marine Corps
- Rank: Colonel
- Commands: New River, North Carolina Marine Base, Henderson Hall
- Conflicts: Gulf War
- Awards: Defense Meritorious Service Medal; Meritorious Service Medal with one Gold Star; Air Medal with Strike Numeral 1; Navy and Marine Corps Achievement Medal; Joint Service Achievement Medal

Anthony E. Van Dyke is a United States Marine Corps colonel and current commander of Marine forces at Henderson Hall in Arlington, Virginia. He has previously served at the United States Navy's European headquarters in London, England and in USMC bases across America.

== Career ==
Van Dyke was born in Forest Grove, Oregon and graduated from Oregon State University in June 1978 with a degree in agriculture. He was commissioned in the Marines as a 2nd lieutenant and completed basic training at Quantico in December 1978, followed by the Naval Flight training course in Pensacola, Florida in May 1980, and training in the CH-46 at Tustin, California in June.

He served as a pilot, classified material control officer, flight line officer and NATOPS officer during two tours to Okinawa and Japan before returning to the United States in 1983 as a squadron weapons and tactics instructor. In August 1984 he returned to Quantico to take part in the Amphibious Warfare School, from which he graduated in 1985 and was assigned to an active unit in various positions such as legal officer, operational test and evaluation projects officer, operations duty officer and flight officer.

In 1989 Van Dyke served as the logistic/supply officer and aircraft maintenance officer in Tustin, California before being sent to Kuwait as part of Operation Desert Shield with the 13th MEU. Returning in 1992, Van Dyke attended Naval Command and Staff College in Newport, Rhode Island, and majored in National Security and Strategic Studies. Joining Joint Task Force Six at El Paso, Texas in 1993, Van Dyke was involved in counter-drug operations stretching from Texas to the U.S. Virgin Islands. After a two-year period as commander of the Marine installation at New River, North Carolina and a short time at Marine Aircraft Group 29 Operations, Van Dyke attended the Air War College at Maxwell Air Force Base, in Montgomery, Alabama.

Completing his course there, Van Dyke then joined the headquarters of U.S. Naval Forces Europe based in London. In July 2001 Van Dyke was assigned to Henderson Hall as branch head of the Joint Staff Branch.

== Awards and decorations ==
Van Dyke's decorations include the following:
Medals:

- Defense Meritorious Service Medal
- Meritorious Service Medal with one gold star
- Air Medal with Strike Numeral 1
- Navy and Marine Corps Achievement Medal
- Combat Action Ribbon
- Navy Unit Commendation
- Joint Service Achievement Medal
- Meritorious Unit Commendation
- National Defense Service Medal
- Sea Service Deployment Ribbon
- Humanitarian Service Medal
- Kuwait Liberation Medal

Badges:

- Parachutist Badge
- Aviator Badge
- Office of the Secretary of Defense Identification Badge
