= William "Bill" Warren (physicist) =

American physicist and professor

- Born: William Willard Warren Jr. 8 February 1938
- Died: 22 January 2024 (aged 85)
- Education: B.S., Stanford University; Ph.D., Washington University, St. Louis
- Scientific career
- Fields: Condensed Matter; Nuclear Magnetic Resonance
- Workplaces: University of California at Los Angeles; Bell Labs; Oregon State University

William "Bill" Warren (1938–2024) was an Emeritus Professor who retired in 2009 from Oregon State University's Department of Physics. He was an American Physical Society Fellow.

== Early life and education ==
William "Bill" Warren, the son of William Willard Warren and Beryl Annette (Bigham) Warren, was born in Seattle, Washington, in 1938.

From 1956 to 1960 Warren completed a B.S. at Stanford University. He finished his 1965 Ph.D. dissertation, Nuclear Magnetic Resonance of XENON-131 in Liquid and Solid Xenon, at Washington University in St. Louis, advised by R. E. Norberg. He continued there as a National Science Foundation Cooperative Graduate Fellow from 1962–1965.

Warren married Nancy Alice Boyd in June 1965.

== Career ==
Warren's publications from 1966–1970 show his workplace as "Department of Physics, University of California, Los Angeles". At UCLA, he researched Nuclear Magnetic Resonance (NMR) in solid and liquid metals.

Between 1970–1990, his publications record his employer as Bell Telephone Laboratories, in Murray Hill, New Jersey, According to Oregon State University Physics Department Chair Henri Jansen, Warren took early retirement from Bell Labs, where he had a distinguished career in research, to join the physics faculty of OSU in January 1991.

At OSU, Warren contributed to solid-state physics research, graduate education, and departmental leadership. He also established a laboratory to investigate the electronic behavior of solid-state materials using nuclear magnetic resonance (NMR) and nuclear quadrupole resonance (NQR) techniques. He and colleagues conducted the first NMR observations and studies of the electronic structure of impurity nuclei in silicon "under 'realistic' conditions (room temperature and above)".

In June 2009, Warren retired from OSU, planning to do more "...hiking, biking, skiing, practicing the piano, and traveling, especially lots of trips to see his and Nancy’s rapidly growing-up grandchildren."

== Selected publications ==
=== Books ===
- Hensel, Friedrich; Warren, Jr., William W. (1999). Fluid Metals: The Liquid−Vapor Transition of Metals. Vol. 122. Princeton, NJ: Princeton University Press. doi:10.1021/ja995765p. ISBN 0-691-05830-X. ISSN 0002-7863.

=== Selected articles ===
- Fowler, John M.; Warren, William; Lambe, Edward D. (1962-12-01). "Lecture Demonstration of Electron Diffraction". American Journal of Physics. 30 (12): 891–894. doi:10.1119/1.1941844. ISSN 0002-9505.
- Warren, William W.; Clark, W. Gilbert (1969-08-10). "Nuclear Magnetic Resonance and Relaxation in Liquid In, Sb, and InSb". Physical Review. 184 (2): 606–606. doi:10.1103/PhysRev.184.606. ISSN 0031-899X.
- Warren, William W.; Clark, W. Gilbert (1970-01-01). "Knight Shift and Nuclear Spin-Lattice Relaxation Rate in Solid and Liquid Copper". Physical Review B. 1 (1): 24–30. doi:10.1103/PhysRevB.1.24. ISSN 0556-2805.
- Warren, William W (1972-06-01). "Nuclear magnetic resonance in semiconducting liquid alloys". Journal of Non-Crystalline Solids. Amorphous and Liquid Semiconductors. 8–10: 241–250. doi:10.1016/0022-3093(72)90142-1. ISSN 0022-3093.
- Schäfer, Gudrun; Warren, William W; Anderson, Paul; Edwards, P. P (1993-05-02). "NMR study of sodium dispersed in zeolites". Journal of Non-Crystalline Solids. 156–158: 803–806. doi:10.1016/0022-3093(93)90073-7. ISSN 0022-3093.
- Redmer, Ronald; Warren, William W. (1993-11-15). "Magnetic susceptibility of Cs and Rb from the vapor to the liquid phase". Physical Review B. 48 (20): 14892–14906. doi:10.1103/PhysRevB.48.14892. ISSN 0163-1829.
- Fuller, Scott E.; Meintjes, Ernesta M.; Warren, Jr., William W. (1996-04-08). "Impurity NMR Study of the Acceptor Band in Si(B)". Physical Review Letters. 76 (15): 2806–2809. doi:10.1103/PhysRevLett.76.2806. ISSN 0031-9007.
- Roberts, Neil; Wang, R.-P.; Sleight, Arthur W.; Warren, William W. (1998-03-01). "27 Al and 69 Ga impurity nuclear magnetic resonance in ZnO:Al and ZnO:Ga". Physical Review B. 57 (10): 5734–5741. doi:10.1103/PhysRevB.57.5734. ISSN 0163-1829.
- Meintjes, Ernesta M.; Danielson, Jeremy; Warren, William W. (2005-01-26). "Temperature-dependent NMR study of the impurity state in heavily doped Si:P". Physical Review B. 71 (3). doi:10.1103/PhysRevB.71.035114. ISSN 1098-0121.

== Awards, honors ==
- 1980 Fellow of the American Physical Society, in the Division of Condensed Matter Physics.
