= Chelle Flamoe =

American basketball player

Career information
- College: Oregon State (1985–1989)
- Position: Guard

Career highlights and awards
- 2x All-Pac 10 (1988, 1989)

Chelle Flamoe is a former women's basketball player who played in college for the Oregon State Beavers, and, later, on the United States Women's Basketball Olympic team.

== College ==
Flamoe ranks third on the Oregon State all-time list for points scored with 1,851. She is also the only Oregon State player to lead the Beavers in minutes played for four consecutive seasons, playing over 1,000 minutes each. She made 784 field goals out of 1516 attempts for a 51.7% career field goal percentage. She recorded over 400 rebounds and assists, as well as over 200 steals.

Honors include making the NorPac All-Freshman Team in 1986, being an All-Pac-10 Team Honorable Mention in 1987, and becoming an All-Pac-10 first team member in both 1988 and 1989. She was also an Academic All-American second team member in 1987, and was Academic All-American first team member and the Academic All-American Player of the Year in both 1988 and 1989.

== Career statistics ==
Legend
GP	Games played	GS	Games started	MPG	Minutes per game	RPG	Rebounds per game
APG	Assists per game	SPG	Steals per game	BPG	Blocks per game	PPG	Points per game
TO	Turnovers per game	FG%	Field-goal percentage	3P%	3-point field-goal percentage	FT%	Free-throw percentage
**Bold**	Career best	°	League leader

=== College ===
Year	Team	GP	GS	MPG	FG%	3P%	FT%	RPG	APG	SPG	BPG	TO	PPG
1987–88	Oregon State	28	-	-	**53.5**	**50.0**	67.5	1.6	3.3	**3.1**	**0.4**	-	**20.0**
1988–89	Oregon State	28	-	-	49.4	35.3	**77.0**	**3.6**	**3.9**	2.4	0.2	-	18.0
**Career**		56	-	-	51.5	36.8	72.2	2.6	3.6	2.8	0.3	-	19.0
Statistics retrieved from Sports-Reference.

== Olympic team ==
Flamoe played in the U.S. Olympic Festival in 1986.
