= Lois Sather McGill =

American food scientist (1923–1995)

- Born: Lois Ann Young; 5 July 1923; Wilsonville
- Died: 21 September 1995
- Alma mater: Oregon State University
- Occupation: Academic staff; researcher; food scientist
- Academic career
- Fields: Food science
- Institutions: Oregon State University (1945–1984)

Lois Sather McGill (1923-1995) was a professor in the Department of Food Sciences and Technology at Oregon State University. She was hired to establish the sensory evaluation program in 1945; she was the first female faculty member in the Department of Food Science and Technology. When she retired, the university granted her Emeritus Professor status.

== Life ==
In 1923, Lois Ann Young was born in Wilsonville, Oregon. She married Glenn V. Sather in 1946 and they had three children between 1948 and 1952. In 1966, Glenn Sather, passed away and in 1969, she married Thomas E. McGill.

== Oregon State University ==
She studied Home Economics at Oregon State University from 1941 to 1945. In 1944, she was Secretary of the Junior class, vice-president of the Physical Education Club, and Secretary of Kappa Delta. She was an Honor Student her final year.

Immediately after graduation, she was hired as a Research Assistant for Food Industries in the Department of Food Sciences and Technology. She was charged with setting up Oregon State University's sensory evaluation program, which was known as "the Flavorium" and provided her with research data for future publications on food technologies.

She left her position at OSU in 1949 to have children and returned after the birth of her third child in 1952. In 1952, she became the first permanent home economist in the food technology and was put in charge of the testing kitchen; her area of study was the use of Oregon fruits in frozen products. In 1964, the department reorganized and she was put in charge of the Sensory Analysis Program. In 1963 she was promoted to Associate Professor and in 1973 to Full Professor. She retired in 1983 and Mina McDaniel was hired to replace her.

Sather McGill wrote or co-wrote technical papers focused on dairy and food science and contributed articles to campus publications.

In 1971, Sather McGill was one of Corvallis’ Women of Achievement and the Oregon State Employees Association faculty chapter named her Employee of the Year. She was the first woman to join the American Association of University Professors OSU chapter in 1977; the chapter was established at OSU in 1926. She was also a member of National Institute of Food Technologies, and was elected as a Fellow in 1983.

She died in 1995.
