= Sophie Brunner =

American basketball player (born 1995)

Personal information
- Born: August 30, 1995 (age 31) Freeport, Illinois, U.S.
- Listed height: 6 ft 1 in (1.85 m)
- Listed weight: 187 lb (85 kg)

Career information
- High school: Aquin (Freeport, Illinois)
- College: Arizona State (2013–2017)
- WNBA draft: 2017: undrafted
- Playing career: 2017–2020
- Position: Forward
- Number: 25, 22

Career history
- 2017: Phoenix Mercury
- 2017: San Antonio Stars

Career highlights
- 3× First-team All-Pac-12 (2015–2017)
- Stats at WNBA.com
- Stats at Basketball Reference
Medals
Women's basketball
Representing the United States
Pan-American Games
Silver medal – second place	2015 Canada	Team

Sophie Brunner (born August 30, 1995) is an American former professional basketball player. She played college basketball for the Arizona State Sun Devils before joining the Phoenix Mercury of the Women's National Basketball Association (WNBA).

== Early life ==
Brunner was born August 30, 1995 in Freeport, Illinois. She attended Aquin High School in Freeport and led the school's basketball team to state championships in her junior and senior years. She was a two-time first-team all-state selection by The Associated Press. In 2012, The News-Gazette named Brunner first-team all-state and the top girls basketball player in the Rockford, Illinois region. However, she was not a highly-ranked college basketball prospect; ESPN ranked her a zero-star recruit.

In 2020, The Journal Standard named Brunner the greatest girls basketball player in Freeport-Rockford region history.

== College career ==
Brunner committed to play college basketball for the Arizona State Sun Devils. In the 2013–2014 season, her freshman year, she averaged 7.6 points and 6.4 rebounds per game and recorded four double-doubles on the season. The team qualified for the 2014 NCAA Division I women's basketball tournament; Brunner recorded 14 points and nine rebounds in a win over the Vanderbilt Commodores and seven points and ten rebounds in a loss to the Notre Dame Fighting Irish. She was an honorable mention to the Pac-12 all-freshmen team.

In her sophomore season, Brunner averaged 11.9 points and 1.2 assists per game while starting every game of the season; additionally, her 7.6 rebounds and 1.8 steals per game were the highest among the Sun Devils. In January 2015, Brunner was named the Pac-12 player of the week after notching a win against the Washington State Cougars and two wins against the Arizona Wildcats. She tallied 14 points and six rebounds in a win over the Ohio Bobcats in the first round of the 2015 NCAA Division I women's basketball tournament. In the second round of the tournament, she recorded her sixth and final double-double of the season, with 17 points and 11 rebounds in a victory against the Little Rock Trojans. She was a first-team All-Pac-12 selection. Brunner was selected to play for the United States women's national basketball team at the 2015 Pan American Games; she contributed six points, six rebounds, and three assists in the second contest of the Games, a victory against the Dominican Republic. Team USA went on to win the silver medal.

Brunner earned a second selection to the All-Pac-12 first team in her junior season. She led Arizona State in points (10.7), rebounds (7.4), and steals (1.7) per game, while additionally averaging 1.9 assists. She missed six games early in the season with an ankle injury. Brunner recorded five double-doubles and led Arizona State to the team's third consecutive NCAA tournament berth.

In the 2016–2017 season, Brunner's senior year, she started in every game. She contributed 1.2 steals and 1.8 assists per game, while her average points (13.6) and rebounds (7.4) led the team. She recorded five double-doubles and surpassed 1,000 career points. On December 11, 2016, Brunner made a game-winning shot with six seconds left in overtime to defeat the Kentucky Wildcats. She led the Sun Devils to the NCAA tournament for the fourth time in four years, tallying nine points, five rebounds, and four assists in a first-round win against the Michigan State Spartans, and was named first-team All-Pac-12 for a third time.

While playing at Arizona State, Brunner earned the nickname "Paws" for her large hands and proficient rebounding ability.

== Professional career ==
Brunner was not selected in the 2017 WNBA draft, but she was signed in free agency by the Phoenix Mercury and made the team's season-opening roster. Later that season, the Mercury traded her to the San Antonio Stars.

After her WNBA career, Brunner played for professional teams in Turin and Sesto San Giovanni in Italy. She returned to her home in Illinois during the COVID-19 lockdowns in Italy, which brought her third season in Italy to an early end.

== Coaching career ==
In 2020, Brunner became an assistant basketball coach at Rockford Christian Schools in Rockford, Illinois. She also began teaching at Rockford Public School District 205.

== Career statistics ==
Legend
GP	Games played	GS	Games started	MPG	Minutes per game	RPG	Rebounds per game
APG	Assists per game	SPG	Steals per game	BPG	Blocks per game	PPG	Points per game
TO	Turnovers per game	FG%	Field-goal percentage	3P%	3-point field-goal percentage	FT%	Free-throw percentage
**Bold**	Career best	°	League leader

=== WNBA ===
WNBA regular season statistics
Year	Team	GP	GS	MPG	FG%	3P%	FT%	RPG	APG	SPG	BPG	TO	PPG
2017	Phoenix	**3**	0	**4.3**	.000	—	—	**1.3**	0.0	0.0	0.0	0.3	0.0
2017	San Antonio	1	0	2.0	—	—	—	0.0	0.0	0.0	0.0	**0.0**	0.0
**Career**	1 year, 2 teams	4	0	3.8	.000	—	—	1.0	0.0	0.0	0.0	0.3	0.0

=== College ===
NCAA statistics
Year	Team	GP	GS	MPG	FG%	3P%	FT%	RPG	APG	SPG	BPG	TO	PPG
2013–14	Arizona State	33	22	21.1	.497	.000	.636	6.4	1.0	0.9	**0.3**	**1.4**	7.6
2014–15	Arizona State	**35**	**35**	26.7	**.543**	.000	**.731**	**7.6**	1.2	**1.8**	**0.3**	2.1	11.9
2015–16	Arizona State	27	27	28.6	.530	**.500**	.684	7.4	**1.9**	1.7	0.2	2.1	10.7
2016–17	Arizona State	33	33	**28.7**	.514	.393	.720	7.4	1.8	1.2	**0.3**	1.9	**13.6**
**Career**		128	117	26.2	.523	.375	.694	7.2	1.5	1.4	0.3	1.9	11.0

== Personal life ==
Brunner has three siblings. She majored in education studies at Arizona State University.
