= Marta Torres =

Marine geochemist

Marta E. Torres is a marine geologist known for her work on the geochemistry of cold seeps and methane hydrates. She is a professor at Oregon State University, and an elected fellow of the Geochemical Society and the Geological Society of America.

== Education and career ==
Torres has a B.S. from the Universidad de Costa Rica (1976), and an M.S. (1983) and a Ph.D. (1988) from Oregon State University. As of 2022 she is a professor at Oregon State University.

== Research ==
Torres is known for her work at cold seeps and gas hydrates, geochemical tracers used to track fluid flow in seep environments, and the chemistry of sediments and porewaters. Her early research examined the minerals associated with cold seeps near Peru, with a focus on barium-containing minerals. Her subsequent research has examined minerals in methane hydrates, methane venting from the seafloor, and barite formed at cold seeps. She has also examined the methane found in gas hydrates in the Arctic, and silicate weathering in anoxic sediments.

== Selected publications ==
- Bohrmann, Gerhard; Greinert, Jens; Suess, Erwin; Torres, Marta (1 July 1998). "Authigenic carbonates from the Cascadia subduction zone and their relation to gas hydrate stability". Geology. 26 (7): 647–650. Bibcode:1998Geo....26..647B. doi:10.1130/0091-7613(1998)026<0647:ACFTCS>2.3.CO;2. ISSN 0091-7613.
- Torres, M. E.; Brumsack, H. J.; Bohrmann, G.; Emeis, K. C. (10 January 1996). "Barite fronts in continental margin sediments: a new look at barium remobilization in the zone of sulfate reduction and formation of heavy barites in diagenetic fronts". Chemical Geology. 127 (1): 125–139. Bibcode:1996ChGeo.127..125T. doi:10.1016/0009-2541(95)00090-9. ISSN 0009-2541.
- Torres, M. E.; Wallmann, K.; Tréhu, A. M.; Bohrmann, G.; Borowski, W. S.; Tomaru, H. (30 September 2004). "Gas hydrate growth, methane transport, and chloride enrichment at the southern summit of Hydrate Ridge, Cascadia margin off Oregon". Earth and Planetary Science Letters. 226 (1): 225–241. Bibcode:2004E&PSL.226..225T. doi:10.1016/j.epsl.2004.07.029. ISSN 0012-821X.
- Torres, M. E.; McManus, J.; Hammond, D. E.; de Angelis, M. A.; Heeschen, K. U.; Colbert, S. L.; Tryon, M. D.; Brown, K. M.; Suess, E. (15 August 2002). "Fluid and chemical fluxes in and out of sediments hosting methane hydrate deposits on Hydrate Ridge, OR, I: Hydrological provinces". Earth and Planetary Science Letters. 201 (3): 525–540. Bibcode:2002E&PSL.201..525T. doi:10.1016/S0012-821X(02)00733-1. ISSN 0012-821X.

== Awards and honors ==
In 2013 Torres was named a fellow of the Geological Society of America and a fellow of Hanse-Wissenschaftskolleg. In 2021 Torres was named a fellow of the Geochemical Society.
