= Staci Simonich =

American environmental scientist

Staci L. Simonich
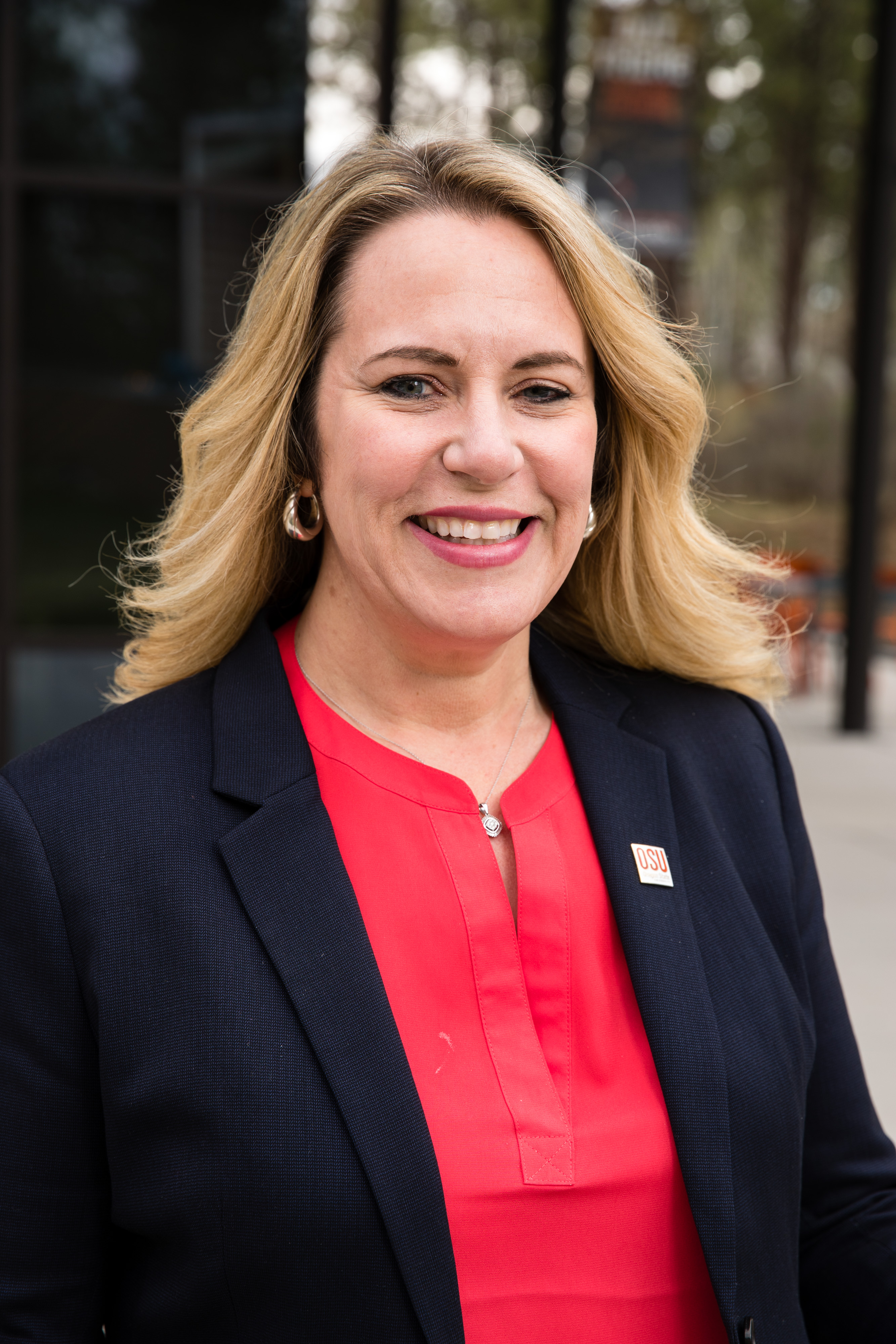
- Education: Indiana University Bloomington; University of Wisconsin - Green Bay; Oregon State University
- Scientific career
- Workplaces: Oregon State University; Procter & Gamble
- Thesis: The role of vegetation in removing semivolatile organic pollutants from the atmosphere (1995)

Staci Simonich is an American environmental scientist who is a professor and dean for the College of Agricultural Sciences at Oregon State University. Her research considers how chemicals move through the environment. She was appointed Fellow of the American Association for the Advancement of Science in 2021.

== Early life and education ==
Simonich grew up in Green Bay, Wisconsin. Her father worked in a paper mill. Her house was near the Fox River, which suffered from issues with pollution. These experiences inspired Simonich to work on environmental issues. Simonich was the first in her family to attend college. She studied chemistry at the University of Wisconsin–Green Bay. As part of her undergraduate research, she studied polychlorinated biphenyls in Green Bay. After graduating she moved to Indiana University Bloomington, where she studied the role of vegetation in removing organic pollutants from the atmosphere. During her doctoral research she studied polycyclic aromatic hydrocarbons in the atmospherere. Her research combines lab-based studies with field experiments and computational modelling. Simonich earned a Master of Business Administration at Oregon State University in 2020.

== Research and career ==
Simonich joined Procter & Gamble, where she spent six years working on consumer food products. She investigated the environmental impacts of P&G ingredients.

Simonich joined Oregon State University in 2001 and continued her work on polycyclic aromatic hydrocarbons (PAHs). Elevated levels of combustion means that emissions of PAHs are high in Asia. Simonich collected PAHs before, during and after the 2008 Summer Olympics and analyzed for various different forms of hydrocarbons. She established a series of remote sites across the Pacific Northwest to monitor atmospheric transport of the PAHs from Beijing to North America. She has shown that PAHs persist over long distances, that they reach with other chemicals, and that they make use of various transport pathways.

Simonich has studied several different types of PAH and monitored their environmental impact. She is particularly interested in environmental remediation and ways to remove PAHs from soil. Unfortunately, some forms of bioremidation can lead the breakdown products that are more toxic than the original compounds.

Simonich was made Executive Associate Dean in 2020.

== Awards and honors ==
- 2003 National Science Foundation CAREER Award
- 2011 Scientific and Technological Achievement Award Level III for Innovative Design, Implementation and Synthesis Assessing Impact of Airborne Contaminants on Western National Parks, United States Environmental Protection Agency
- 2013 Oregon State University Impact Award for Outstanding Scholarship
- 2013 Super Reviewer Award, Environmental Science & Technology (Journal)
- 2015 Oregon State University Excellence in Graduate Mentoring Award
- 2015 James and Mildred Oldfield/E.R. Jackman Team Award, in recognition of Oregon State University Superfund Research Program
- 2021 Elected Fellow of the American Association for the Advancement of Science

== Selected publications ==
- Simonich SL; Hites RA (1995). "Global distribution of persistent organochlorine compounds". Science. 269 (5232): 1851–1854. doi:10.1126/science.7569923. PMID 7569923. Wikidata Q34296395.
- S. L. Simonich; R. A. Hites (1995). "Organic pollutant accumulation in vegetation". Environmental Science & Technology. 29 (12): 2905–2914. doi:10.1021/es00012a004. PMID 22148195. Wikidata Q82840856.
- S. L. Simonich; R. A. Hites (1994). "Vegetation-atmosphere partitioning of polycyclic aromatic hydrocarbons". Environmental Science & Technology. 28 (5): 939–943. doi:10.1021/es00054a028. PMID 22191838. Wikidata Q83107963.
