= Pamela Cytrynbaum =

American journalist

- Occupations: Journalist; instructor in journalism, executive director, blogger
- Notable credit(s): The New York Times, The Miami Herald, Chicago Tribune,The Washington Post, Times-Picayune, Chicago Sun-Times, The Oregonian, Psychology Today, Teaching Tolerance

Pamela Cytrynbaum is an American journalist who teaches and specializes in investigative reporting and restorative justice. She is the executive director of the Chicago Innocence Center and a restorative justice practitioner.

== Education ==
Cytrynbaum is a graduate of Evanston Township High School and received her BSJ from Northwestern University's Medill School of Journalism. She received her MAT from Oregon State University.

== Career ==
As a journalist, Cytrynbaum reported on criminal justice issues for the New Orleans Times-Picayune before becoming a staff writer for the Chicago Tribune (1992–1997), where she was columnist Mike Royko's "legman." Her work has been published in The New York Times, The Miami Herald, The Chicago Sun-Times, The Washington Post, The New Orleans Times-Picayune, the Jewish Daily Forward, and The Oregonian.

Cytrynbaum is the executive director of The Chicago Innocence Center. As field advisor for the center's team of interns, she co-teaches weekly seminars alongside CIC President and Founder David Protess. Cytrynbaum is also in charge of fundraising and public speaking, outreach, managing the center's social media presence, reviewing cases, and overseeing the interns' work.

Cytrynbaum serves on the advisory board of the Center for Prosecutor Integrity (2014–present), a Maryland-based nonprofit fighting to end prosecutorial misconduct. She works in the restorative justice movement, collaborating with the Evanston Police Department to lead peace circles and organizing victim-offender conferences in District 65 elementary schools in Evanston (2014–present). She is also a member of the International Advisory Board of the Community of Restorative Researchers.

She is a former blogger for NBCUniversal (2011–2012). She currently writes about parenting, divorce, and various social justice issues as a regular blogger for both Psychology Today (2009–present) and Teaching Tolerance, the educational magazine of The Southern Poverty Law Center (2011–present).

== Teaching ==
For over 7 years, Cytrynbaum taught journalism and media courses at Oregon State University and in the University of Oregon’s School of Journalism and Communication. There, she worked with faculty to create the High School Journalism Workshop for Minority Students.

From 2005 to 2007, Cytrynbaum taught American Studies and Journalism at Brandeis University where she served as associate director of the Schuster Institute for Investigative Journalism and director of the Justice Brandeis Innocence Project (now the Justice Brandeis Law Project).

Cytrynbaum taught undergraduate and graduate journalism courses in writing, reporting, and multimedia journalism at Northwestern University's Medill School of Journalism from 2010 to 2012. She won the Students' Choice Award For Teaching] in 2012.

== Works ==
Cytrynbaum's writings have appeared in a number of publications which include:

- The New York Times
- The Washington Post
- Psychology Today
- The Times-Picayune
- Teaching Tolerance
- The Miami Herald
- Chicago Tribune
- The Oregonian
- The Chicago Sun-Times
