= Timothy S. Leatherman =

American businessman

- Born: Portland, Oregon, U.S.
- Education: Oregon State University
- Occupations: Businessman, inventor
- Organization(s): Leatherman Tool Group, Inc.
- Known for: Namesake Leatherman multi-tools

Timothy S. Leatherman is an American businessman and the founder and Shareholder of Leatherman Tool Group, Inc..

== Biography ==
Leatherman graduated from Oregon State University in 1970 with a bachelor's degree in mechanical engineering. While there, he met a Vietnamese exchange student named Chau, and moved to her hometown Saigon in 1972, where they were married. They returned to the US just before the fall of Saigon in 1975, and decided to embark on a trip to Europe and Middle East. In Amsterdam, they bought a 1969 Fiat 600 for $300, which repeatedly malfunctioned. According to The Oregonian, "Leatherman came up with the idea of a 'Boy Scout knife with pliers' during a 1975 driving tour of Europe with his wife, when he was unable to use his pocket knife to fix his repeatedly malfunctioning car." It took him several years afterwards to refine his idea, and he was granted a patent on the first Leatherman tool in 1980. Leatherman spent the next few years attempting to market his product to large companies with technical staff, such as AT&T, but this was largely unsuccessful. The tool eventually gained popularity through mail-order catalogues.

== See also ==
- List of Oregon State University alumni
