= Henderson Hall (Arlington, Virginia) =

US Marine Corps base near Arlington, Virginia, United States

Marine Corps Support Facility Henderson Hall
- Part of Joint Base Myer–Henderson Hall
- Arlington, Virginia in the United States
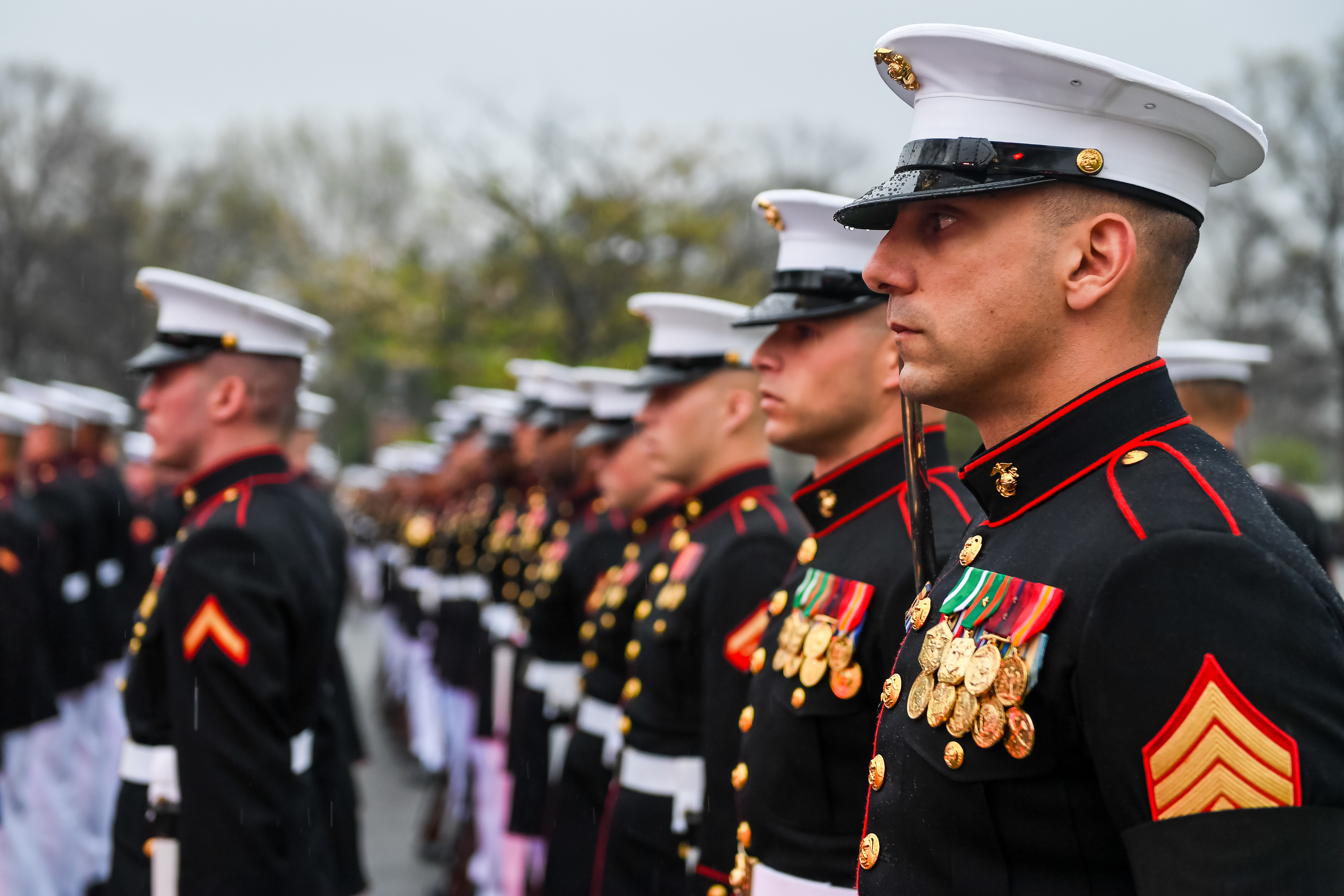
- Marines assigned to the US Marine Corps Honor Guard stand in formation at Joint Base Myer-Henderson Hall in April 2017

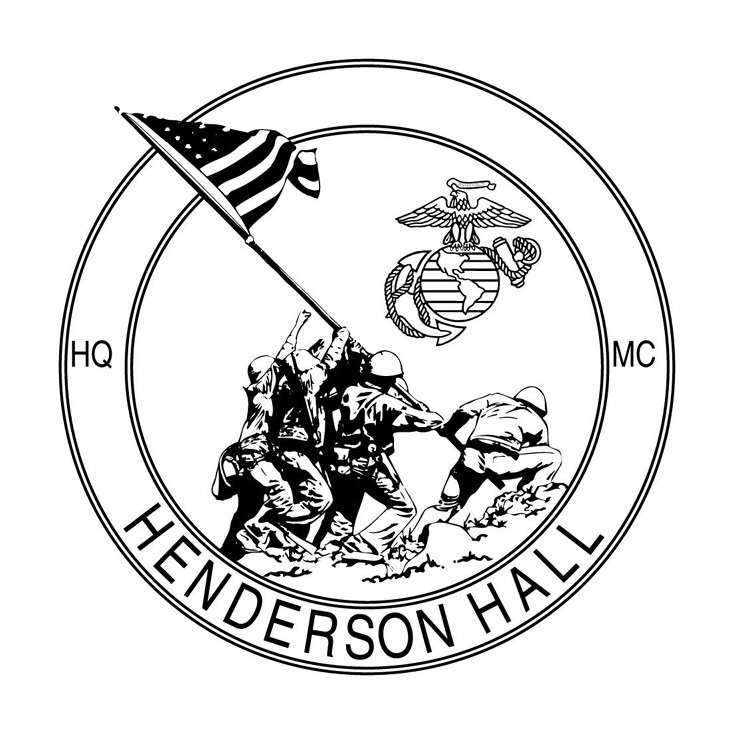

Site information
- Type: Marine Corps support facility
- Owner: Department of Defense
- Operator: US Marine Corps
- Controlled by: Headquarters Marine Corps
- Condition: Operational
- Website: Official website

Location
- Location in the United States
- Coordinates: 38.868812°N 77.072648°W

Site history
- Built: 1941
- In use: 1941 – present

Garrison information
- Current commander: Colonel Andrew R. Winthrop
- Garrison: Headquarters and Service Battalion

Henderson Hall is a military installation of the United States Marine Corps (USMC) located in Arlington County, Virginia, near the Pentagon, on the southern edge of Arlington National Cemetery and next to Fort Myer. Currently, it is part of Joint Base Myer–Henderson Hall. Henderson Hall is named for Brevet Brigadier General Archibald Henderson, the fifth and longest-serving commandant of the Marine Corps.

== History of Henderson Hall ==
Most of the land occupied by Henderson Hall was originally owned by the Custis family and later the Syphax family. Maria Carter Syphax, the matriarch of the Syphax family, was rumored to be the mulatto daughter of George Washington Parke Custis, grandson of Martha Washington and founder of the Arlington Estate on the banks of the Potomac River (later the home of Robert E. Lee). The Spyhax family sold the land to John Dormoyle in 1901, who then sold it to Frederick Rice in 1924.

Much of the rest of the land beneath Henderson Hall was part of the Arlington Estate as well. In 1941, the federal government built a temporary warehouse on this land, calling it Federal Office Building No. 2. It quickly was converted into office space for use by the U.S. Navy, and informally renamed the Navy Annex.

The USMC headquarters moved to the Navy Annex in November 1941. A Headquarters and Service Company was organized on March 1, 1942, and a Women Marine Company (part of the United States Marine Corps Women's Reserve) organized as part of the headquarters unit on April 1, 1943. To house both companies, the Marine Corps began acquiring, through purchase, easement, eminent domain, and other means, property to the west and northwest of the Navy Annex Building. This included most of the Syphax land, except for that already purchased by Abbey Mausoleum. Henderson Hall was built on this property in September 1943 to house both companies. All told, 23 acres (93,000 m^{2}) were acquired, and athletic fields, a bowling alley, chapel, firing range, gas station, gym, hobby shop, officers' and enlisted men's clubs, post exchange, post office, radio station, supply depot, and swimming pool were all built on the site.

The Women's Reserve was released from active duty in August 1946, and the women's barracks at Henderson Hall renovated into billeting space for male Marines.

Land acquisition ended in 1952, and on February 1, 1954, the Commonwealth of Virginia executed a document ceding political jurisdiction over the land to the U.S. federal government.

== About Henderson Hall today ==
Covering 25.6 acres (104,000 m^{2}) of land, Henderson Hall is home to the USMC headquarters company unit and associated educational facilities. Since 2009, Henderson Hall is jointly managed by the Marine Corps and the Army as Joint Base Myer–Henderson Hall. The management of Marine Corps Community Services programs and facilities lies with Headquarters & Service Battalion, Headquarters Marine Corps, Henderson Hall.

Little at Henderson Hall is historic. All 19th and early 20th century buildings were demolished during its construction, and grading and construction at the site have destroyed whatever archaeological artifacts might have existed. Nearly all the buildings on the campus today are from the late 20th century.

== See also ==
- History of the United States Marine Corps
- List of United States Marine Corps installations
- 2017 Guide to MCCS Henderson Hall
