= Octave Levenspiel =

American professor of chemical engineering

Octave Levenspiel (January 1, 1926 – March 5, 2017) was a professor of chemical engineering at Oregon State University (OSU). His principal interest was chemical reaction engineering, and he was the author of a major textbook Chemical Reaction Engineering as well as numerous research publications.

== Life ==
Levenspiel was born in Shanghai, Republic of China, in 1926, the son of Abe and Lily Levenspiel, who were Polish Jews who had gone to China to escape oppression in Europe. At the age of 15, he was on a ship to the US when the Attack on Pearl Harbor occurred, so he was interned in Manila until the end of the war. In the US, he graduated with a bachelor's degree from Berkeley in 1947. He obtained his PhD from OSU in 1952, and after a period teaching at other schools returned to OSU where he spent the remainder of his career, retiring in 1991 but continuing as emeritus professor.

In 1952 he married Mary Jo Smiley and they had three children. He died on March 5, 2017.

== Work ==
The Levenspiel plot is named after him.

Levenspiel was well known among his students for his ability to do quick back-of-the-envelope calculations. GNU Octave, a high-level language primarily intended for numerical computations and developed by John W. Eaton, a former student of Octave Levenspiel, is named after him.

== Books ==
All of Levenspiel's books listed below have been translated to several other languages.

- Chemical Reaction Engineering, Wiley; 3 Sub edition (August 13, 1998), ISBN 0-471-25424-X
- The Chemical Reactor Omnibook, Oregon St Univ Bookstores (January 1993), ISBN 0-88246-160-5
- Fluidization Engineering (coauthored), Butterworth-Heinemann Ltd; (October 1991), ISBN 0-409-90233-0
- Engineering Flow and Heat Exchange, Plenum Pub Corp (Dez. 1984), ISBN 0-306-41599-2
- Understanding Engineering Thermo, Prentice Hall PTR; (September 4, 1996), ISBN 0-13-531203-5
- Rambling through Science and Technology, Lulu, 2007

== Awards ==
- R.H. Wilhelm award (AIChE)
- W.K. Lewis award (AIChE)
- Founders award with gold medal (AIChE)
- ChE Lectureship award (ASEE)
- P.V. Danckwerts award (IChemE)
- Honorary doctorates from France, Serbia, and the Colorado School of Mines
- Elected into the National Academy of Engineering (2000)
- Amundson award (ISCRE/NASCRE) (2001)

== Links ==
- Octave Levenspiel Home page
- Levenspiel fountain
- Octave, Tavy, Professor, Dad, Octopus, Papa
