= Cate Reese =

American basketball player (born 1999)

No. 25 – MB Zagłębie Sosnowiec
- Position: Forward
- League: Basket Liga Kobiet; EuroCup Women

Personal information
- Born: November 5, 1999 (age 27)
- Listed height: 6 ft 2 in (1.88 m)

Career information
- High school: Cypress Woods (Cypress, Texas)
- College: Arizona (2018–2023)
- WNBA draft: 2023: undrafted
- Playing career: 2023–present

Career history
- 2023: Gold Coast Rollers
- 2023–2025: Kangoeroes Mechelen
- 2025–present: MB Zagłębie Sosnowiec

Career highlights
- WNIT champion (2019); 4× All-Pac-12 Team (2020–2023); Pac-12 All-Freshman Team (2019); McDonald's All-American (2018)
- Stats at WNBA.com
- Stats at Basketball Reference

Catherine Reese (born November 5, 1999) is an American professional basketball player for MB Zagłębie Sosnowiec of the Basket Liga Kobiet. She played college basketball for the Arizona Wildcats. A four-time All-Pac-12 selection, Reese helped the Wildcats advance to the national championship game as a junior and win the Women's National Invitational Tournament as a freshman. She attended Cypress Woods High School in Cypress, Texas, where she was rated a five-star recruit by ESPN and named a McDonald's All-American, and joined Arizona as the highest-rated recruit in program history.

== Early life and high school career ==
Catherine Reese was born prematurely and was kept in an intensive care unit for three weeks because her lungs were not developed enough. She began playing basketball at age seven. Reese attended Cypress Woods High School in Cypress, Texas and became a starter in her freshman season in 2014 under coach Virginia Flores. As a freshman, she averaged 12.2 points and 8.3 rebounds per game, helping her team win the Class 6A state title, its first state championship. In her sophomore season, Reese averaged 20.8 points and 12.8 rebounds per game, and was named District 17-6A Most Valuable Player (MVP). That year, she joined the Texas Elite Amateur Athletic Union program. As a junior, she averaged 22.3 points and 13.2 rebounds per game. In her senior season, Reese averaged 30.6 points and 15.3 rebounds per game, earning District 17-6A MVP honors. She competed in the McDonald's All-American Game, where she recorded eight points and five rebounds. She left as a three-time Class 6A all-state selection by the Texas Association of Basketball Coaches, and as Cypress Woods' all-time leader in points and rebounds.

=== Recruiting ===
Reese was considered a five-star recruit and the number 12 player in the 2018 class by ESPN. She announced her commitment to play college basketball for Arizona over scholarship offers from Baylor and South Carolina, among other NCAA Division I programs. Reese became the highest-ranked recruit in Arizona history. She was drawn to the program due to her trust in head coach Adia Barnes and because her sister, Ali, would attend the school.

== College career ==
In her freshman season at Arizona, Reese developed a reputation for her toughness and competitiveness, which helped her succeed despite being undersized for her position. On November 9, 2018, she made her debut, recording a season-high 21 points and 10 rebounds in a 71–46 win against Idaho State. Reese would score 21 points two more times that season. On December 5, she posted 20 points and 18 rebounds in a 100–51 victory over Montana. Reese grabbed the most rebounds in a game by an Arizona freshman since Shawntinice Polk in 2002. She helped her team win the 2019 Women's National Invitation Tournament and was named to the all-tournament team. As a freshman, Reese averaged 11.8 points and 6.8 rebounds per game, leading all Pac-12 freshmen in both categories, and was selected to the Pac-12 All-Freshman Team.

Reese became a more versatile player in her sophomore season and particularly improved her three-point shooting. At the 2020 Pac-12 Tournament quarterfinals, she recorded a season-high 30 points and six rebounds in an 86–73 win over California. As a sophomore, Reese averaged 13.6 points and 7.5 rebounds per game, and received All-Pac-12 recognition. On December 6, 2020, she scored a junior season-high 25 points in a 78–77 victory against USC. On February 8, 2021, Reese scored 25 points again and shot 11-of-14 from the field in a 79–59 win over Oregon. She helped Arizona reach its first national championship game. As a junior, Reese averaged 10.9 points and 5.1 rebounds per game, making the All-Pac-12 Team for a second straight season. As a senior, she became Arizona's offensive leader with the departure of Aari McDonald. On January 9, 2022, Reese scored a season-high 29 points in a 76–67 loss to USC. She dislocated her shoulder against Washington State on February 20. Reese returned on March 19 for the first round of the 2022 NCAA tournament, wearing a shoulder brace, and scored 16 points in a 72–67 win over UNLV. She averaged 14.3 points and six rebounds per game, leading her team in both categories, and earned her third straight All-Pac-12 selection. After the season, Reese underwent surgery to repair a torn labrum and torn tendons from her shoulder dislocation. She opted to return to Arizona for a fifth season of eligibility, granted by the NCAA due to the COVID-19 pandemic. On February 5, 2023, Reese scored a career-high 33 points in an 81–75 double-overtime win over USC. As a fifth-year player, she averaged 13.2 points and 5.8 rebounds per game, becoming the second four-time All-Pac-12 selection in program history.

== Professional career ==
After going undrafted in the 2023 WNBA draft, Reese signed with the Gold Coast Rollers of the NBL1 North in Australia. She averaged 22.9 points and 8.4 rebounds per game in 11 appearances. On July 2, 2023, she signed with Kangoeroes Mechelen of the Belgian Women's Basketball League.

== Career statistics ==
Legend
GP	Games played	GS	Games started	MPG	Minutes per game	RPG	Rebounds per game
APG	Assists per game	SPG	Steals per game	BPG	Blocks per game	PPG	Points per game
TO	Turnovers per game	FG%	Field-goal percentage	3P%	3-point field-goal percentage	FT%	Free-throw percentage
**Bold**	Career best	°	League leader

=== College ===
Year	Team	GP	GS	MPG	FG%	3P%	FT%	RPG	APG	SPG	BPG	TO	PPG
2018–19	Arizona	**37**	**37**	25.6	**.493**	.300	.798	6.8	**.6**	.8	**.8**	2.0	11.8
2019–20	Arizona	31	31	**29.2**	.491	.353	**.802**	**7.5**	.5	**1.1**	.6	1.7	13.6
2020–21	Arizona	27	27	24.5	.465	**.406**	.722	5.1	.6	1.0	.3	1.7	11.8
2021–22	Arizona	26	26	26.4	.451	.257	.716	6.0	**1.1**	.9	.3	1.8	**14.3**
2022–23	Arizona	32	32	28.4	.459	.211	.740	5.8	1.0	.8	.5	**1.6**	13.2
**Career**		153	153	26.8	47.3	29.3	75.6	6.3	0.8	0.9	0.5	1.8	12.8
Statistics retrieved from Sports-Reference.

== Personal life ==
Reese is the daughter of William and Cheryl Reese. She has two older sisters, Karen and Ali, and two older brothers, Billy and Danny. Reese was a high school basketball teammate of Ali, who played for Arizona as a walk-on before medically retiring and served as a student manager for the team. On April 4, 2016, as a sophomore in high school, Reese was diagnosed with Type 1 diabetes, the same disease that Ali has. In February 2020, during a road trip in her sophomore season at Arizona, she was hospitalized twice due to an unsafe surge in her blood sugar levels. Reese majored in business management at the University of Arizona and pursued master's degree.
