= 2021 NCAA Division I women's basketball championship game =

2021 NCAA Tournament Championship Game
National championship game
Arizona Wildcats	Stanford Cardinal
Pac-12	Pac-12
(21–5)	(30–2)
53	54
Head coach: Adia Barnes	Head coach: Tara VanDerveer
- AP: 11
- Coaches: 11
- AP: 2
- Coaches: 2
	1	2	3	4	Total
Arizona Wildcats	8	16	16	13	53
Stanford Cardinal	16	15	12	11	54
- Date: April 4, 2021
- Venue: Alamodome, San Antonio, Texas
- MVP: Haley Jones, Stanford
- Favorite: Stanford by 7.5
- Attendance: 4,604
- National anthem: Spensha Baker

United States TV coverage
- Network: ESPN
- Announcers: Ryan Ruocco (play-by-play); Rebecca Lobo (analyst); Holly Rowe (sideline); LaChina Robinson (sideline)
- Nielsen Ratings: 0.92 (4.07 million)

The 2021 NCAA Division I women's basketball championship game was the final game of the 2021 NCAA Division I women's basketball tournament, when the Stanford Cardinal defeated the Arizona Wildcats to become the national champions for the 2020–21 NCAA Division I women's basketball season. The game was played on April 4, 2021, at the Alamodome in San Antonio, Texas.

== Participants ==
The 2021 championship game was the seventh to feature two teams from the same conference and the first to feature two teams from the Pac-12 Conference. Stanford and Arizona met twice during the regular season, with Stanford winning both meetings. The Cardinal recorded an 81–74 win on the road on January 1, 2021, and defeated the Wildcats again at home, 62–48, on February 22, 2021. The championship game was the 86th meeting all-time between the teams, with Stanford leading the series 71–14. Regardless of the game's result, the winner was guaranteed to have been first national champion from the Pac-12 Conference since Stanford in 1992.

=== Arizona ===
Arizona, led by fifth-year head coach Adia Barnes, finished the regular season with a record of 15 wins and 4 losses (15–4), including wins over three teams ranked in the AP top 25 poll. The Wildats recorded a 13–4 conference record, earning them the No. 2 seed in the Pac-12 tournament, where they defeated No. 7 seed Washington State in the quarterfinals but fell in the semifinals to No. 3 seed UCLA. They were awarded an at-large invitation to the NCAA tournament, given to teams that did not win their conference tournament but receive invites to the NCAA tournament anyway, and received the No. 3 seed in the Mercado Regional. In the tournament, they defeated No. 14 seed Stony Brook and No. 11 seed BYU to reach their second Sweet Sixteen. (Note: The "Sweet Sixteen" refers to the NCAA tournament's regional semifinal round, at which point sixteen teams remain.) With their next win, against No. 2 seed Texas A&M, Arizona advanced to the Elite Eight (Note: The "Elite Eight" refers to the NCAA tournament's regional final round, at which point eight teams remain.) for the first time in program history, where they then defeated No. 4 seed Indiana to reach the Final Four. (Note: The "Final Four" refers to the NCAA tournament's national semifinal round, at which point four teams remain.) In the Final Four, Arizona led wire-to-wire in an upset of No. 1 UConn to reach their first national championship.

=== Stanford ===
Stanford, led by 35th-year head coach Tara VanDerveer, finished the regular season with a record of 22–2, including wins over five ranked teams. The Cardinal recorded a 19–2 conference record, earning them the No. 1 seed in the Pac-12 tournament, where they defeated No. 8 seed USC, No. 5 seed Oregon State, and No. 3 seed UCLA en route to their 14th Pac-12 tournament championship. By virtue of winning their conference tournament, they were awarded an automatic invitation to the NCAA tournament, where they received a No. 1 seed and were placed into the Alamo Regional. In the NCAA tournament, they defeated No. 16 seed Utah Valley and No. 8 seed Oklahoma State to reach the Sweet Sixteen for the 27th time in program history. The Cardinal then defeated No. 5 seed Missouri State and No. 2 seed Louisville to win the Alamo Regional and reach their 14th Final Four. In the Final Four, Stanford defeated fellow No. 1 seed South Carolina by one point to reach their fifth title game; they entered seeking their third national championship.

== Starting lineups ==
Arizona	Position		Stanford
Trinity Baptiste 2	F		Cameron Brink
Sam Thomas	F	G	Anna Wilson
Cate Reese	F	G	Lexie Hull
Aari McDonald 1	G		Haley Jones
Bendu Yeaney	G		Kiana Williams 2
Selected in a WNBA Draft: 2021 • Source

== Game summary ==
The game, played at the Alamodome in San Antonio, Texas, began at 5:00 p.m. CDT. Shortly after tip-off, Stanford quickly took control of the contest. Both teams led briefly early in the first quarter before Lexie Hull took the lead for the Cardinal with 7:57 to play; they retained that lead for the remainder of the quarter, going on a 12–0 run and forcing the Wildcats to take an early timeout. The teams then traded two-point field goals before Trinity Baptiste scored a three-pointer to cut the Cardinal lead to 16–8; those points were the last of the quarter.

Arizona started the second quarter well, scoring twice to cut the lead to four before the teams traded shots. The Wildcats went on a run of their own from the late first quarter to the start of the second, a 12–2 span that put Arizona down by just one. Ashten Prechtel's layup with 6:21 on the clock put an end to the run, but a pair of free throws by Shaina Pellington shortly thereafter cut the Cardinal lead to one. Some moments later, a Pellington layup gave Arizona their first lead since the game was 3–2 in the first quarter. From there, the remainder of the half was controlled by the Cardinal, as they sparked an 11–0 run that put them up by ten before an Arizona layup and free throw cut the deficit to seven, where it remained until the buzzer.

The teams played evenly for much of the third quarter; entering up seven, Stanford traded baskets with Arizona before a pair of layups put the Cardinal up by 11. Aari McDonald quickly made a three-pointer and a pair of free throws to cut the lead to six, but Stanford responded with a couple of two-point baskets of their own to reestablish their double-digit lead. Over the remainder of the quarter, Arizona forced several turnovers on a 9–2 run to bring the margin down to three.

Stanford started the final quarter strongly, making three field goals in the first three minutes to extend their lead to eight. Aari McDonald made a three-pointer, to which Cameron Brink responded with a lay-in on a deep seal and then a block of a Shaina Pellington shot, before Arizona's offense converted several shots to cut the margin to a single point. With 2:24 to play, Stanford's Haley Jones completed a three-point play to make the score 54–50. From there, the only points scored were three free throws by Aari McDonald; despite a turnover on a shot clock violation by Stanford with six seconds left, the Wildcats were unable to overcome the one-point deficit, giving Stanford their third national title and first since 1992. With Tara VanDerveer having been Stanford's head coach since 1985 (taking the 1995–96 season off to coach the US women's national team at the 1996 Summer Olympics) and thus having coached all three of the program's national title teams, the 29-year gap between her most recent national titles is the longest in NCAA Division I history for a head coach in any sport.

ESPN

April 4, 2021
5:00 pm CDT

Box score

No. 3 Arizona Wildcats 53, No. 1 Stanford Cardinal 54
Scoring by quarter: 8–16, 16–15, 16–12, 13–11
Pts: A. McDonald – 22; Rebs: S. Thomas, S. Pellington – 7 Asts: T. Baptiste, A. McDonald – 2	Pts: H. Jones – 17; Rebs: Le. Hull – 10; Asts: K. Williams, A. Wilson, A. Prechtel – 3

Alamodome – San Antonio, Texas
Attendance: 4,604
Referees: Cheryl Flores, Maj Forsberg, Felicia Grinter

Starters:			Pts	Reb	Ast
F	25	Cate Reese	4	1	0
F	14	Sam Thomas	0	7	0
F	0	Trinity Baptiste	7	4	2
G	23	Bendu Yeaney	2	2	1
G	2	Aari McDonald	22	3	2
Reserves:					
F	32	Lauren Ware	0	1	0
G	1	Shaina Pellington	15	7	0
G	13	Helena Pueyo	3	2	0
Head coach:
Adia Barnes

Arizona	Stanford

Starters:			Pts	Reb	Ast
F	22	Cameron Brink	10	6	1
G	30	Haley Jones	17	8	1
G	12	Lexie Hull	10	10	2
G	23	Kiana Williams	5	2	3
G	3	Anna Wilson	5	4	3
Reserves:					
F	11	Ashten Prechtel	7	8	3
F	5	Francesca Belibi	0	2	0
F	10	Alyssa Jerome	0	4	1
G	4	Jana Van Gytenbeek	0	0	0
G	33	Hannah Jump	0	1	1
G	24	Lacie Hull	0	0	0
Head coach:
Tara VanDerveer

== Media coverage ==
The Championship Game was televised in the United States by ESPN.

== See also ==
- 2021 NCAA Division I men's basketball championship game
- 2021 NCAA Division I women's basketball tournament
