= Anna Wilson (basketball) =

American basketball player (born 1997)

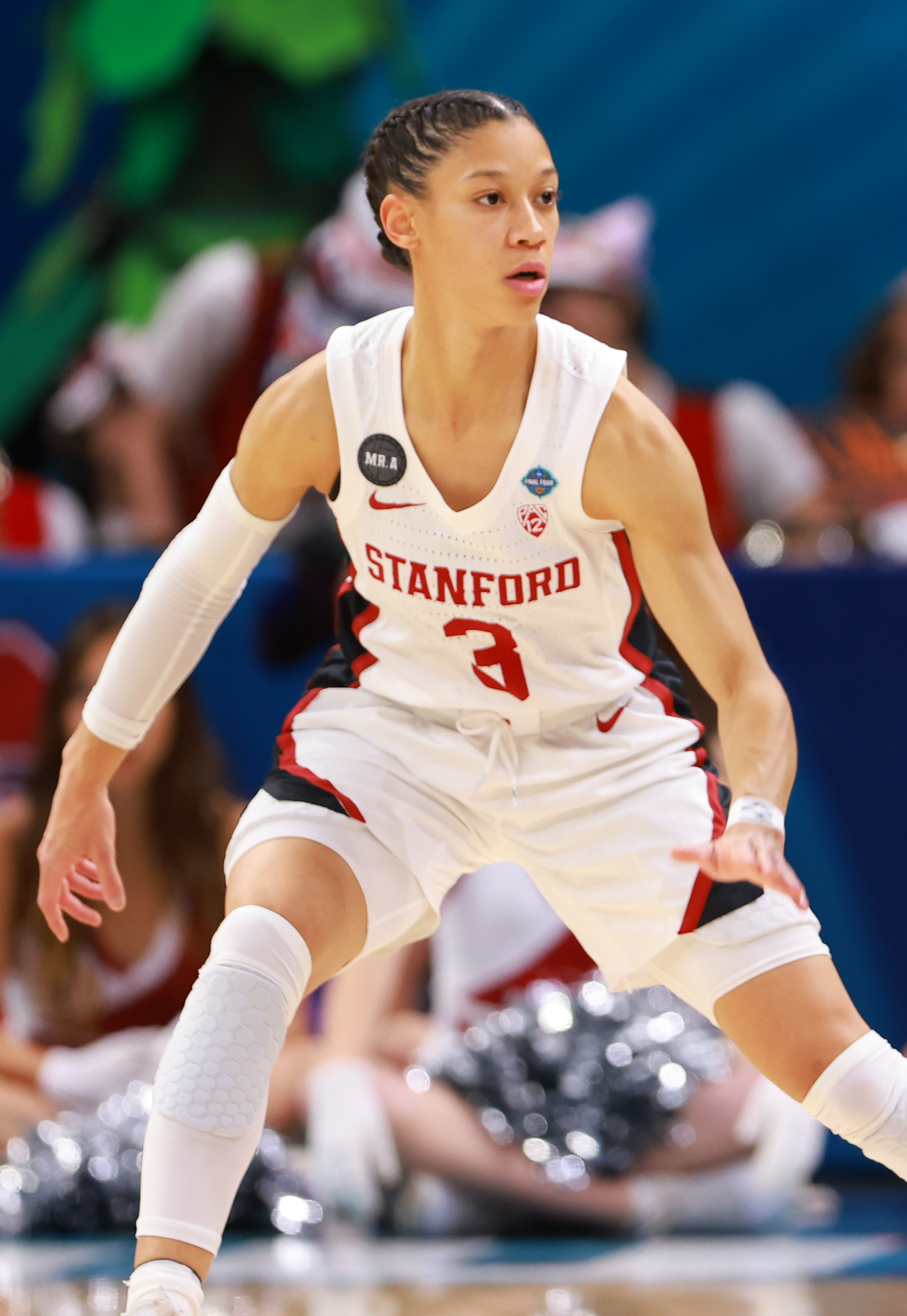
- Wilson with Stanford in 2022

Personal information
- Born: July 12, 1997 (age 28) Richmond, Virginia, US
- Listed height: 5 ft 9 in (1.75 m)

Career information
- High school: Collegiate School (Richmond, Virginia); Bellevue (Bellevue, Washington)
- College: Stanford (2016–2022)
- WNBA draft: 2022: undrafted
- Position: Guard
- Number: 3

Career highlights
- NCAA champion (2021); Pac-12 Co-Defensive Player of the Year (2021); 2× Pac-12 All-Defensive Team (2021, 2022); McDonald's All-American (2016)
Medals
Women's basketball
Representing the United States
FIBA Under-17 World Cup
Gold medal – first place	2014 Czech Republic	Team

Anna Christine Wilson (born July 12, 1997) is an American former college basketball player for the Stanford Cardinal of the Pac-12 Conference. As a guard, she holds the team record for most games played over a career with 160, the fourth-most in the history of the National Collegiate Athletic Association (NCAA). At the 2014 FIBA Under-17 World Championship for Women, she won a gold medal as a part of Team USA.

She played three seasons of high school basketball for Collegiate School, where she set the team record for career assists with 246 and had the fifth-most points in team history with 735. Moving to play as a senior for the Bellevue High School Wolverines, her team finished the year with an undefeated season and won the 2016 Class 3A girls state championship. She was named to the McDonald's All-American Game, an all-star girls' basketball game composed of many top-ranked American and Canadian high school basketball graduating seniors. At Stanford, Wilson played primarily a bench role until her fifth-year senior season. As a fifth-year senior, she started every game, was named the Pac-12 Co-Defensive Player of the Year and made the Pac-12 All-Defensive Team, and won the 2021 NCAA Division I national championship with the Cardinal. She finished her career with Stanford in 2022 after six seasons, and again made the Pac-12 All-Defensive Team. After college, Wilson declared for the 2022 WNBA draft, where she went unselected.

== Early life ==
Anna Christine Wilson was born on July 12, 1997 in Richmond, Virginia, to Tammy and Harrison Wilson III, her mother a nurse and her father a lawyer. Her father played American football and baseball at Dartmouth College. Her grandmother was a college professor and her uncle graduated from Harvard Law School. By age five, she began playing basketball, and, as she got older, her father coached her at a local YMCA before he died when she was 12.

Wilson participated in the United States Under-16 national team trials in 2013. She won a gold medal at the 2014 FIBA Under-17 World Championship for Women as the United States defeated Spain in the final, 77–75; Wilson played 3:05 minutes and missed her only field goal attempted. She attended Collegiate School in Richmond, Virginia before she moved to Bellevue, Washington for her senior year. At Collegiate, she modelled how she played after Steve Nash. After three seasons, she held Collegiate's career assists record with 246 and had the fifth-most points in team history with 735. For the Bellevue High School Wolverines, Wilson was voted a captain of the team by her teammates. She played as a point guard, and averaged 15.3 points per game, 3.2 steals per game, and 4.6 assists per game as Bellevue finished with an undefeated record and won a Class 3A girls state championship.

ESPN HoopGurlz ranked Wilson as a five-star prospect and the 42nd-best player in the United States while recruiting website Prospects Nation ranked Wilson as the 34th-best player and as a four-star prospect. She graduated high school in 2016. She was selected for the McDonald's All-American Game, an all-star girls' basketball game which comprised many of the top-ranked American and Canadian high school basketball graduating seniors and was played the same day as a counterpart boys' game. Before the match, she suffered a concussion in practice, which was her third; consequently, she did not play in the game. As a high school sophomore, she verbally committed to attend and play for Stanford University, and had offers from Wake Forest, Maryland, Marquette, Wisconsin, and Virginia.

== College career ==
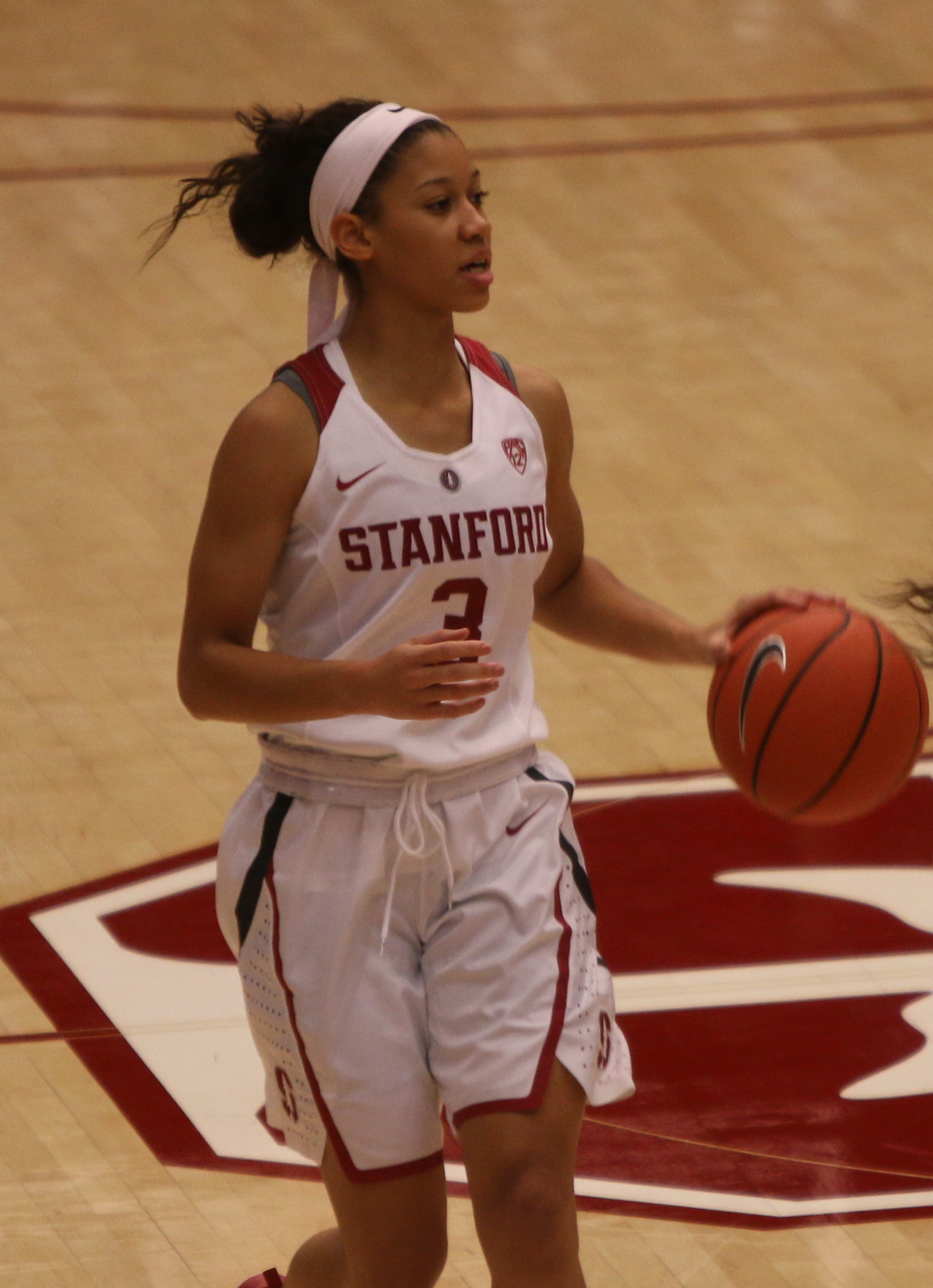
Wilson with Stanford as a freshman in 2016

Wilson only played in six games during her freshman year with the Stanford Cardinal due to health issues: she missed the first eleven games as she recovered from her concussion, and missed the final eleven games of the season with a right foot injury. She made her Stanford debut against the Yale Bulldogs, where she scored eleven points over seventeen minutes played in a 102–44 Stanford victory. She finished her freshman year with seventeen points over forty-eight minutes played. She made her first career start against the UNLV Lady Rebels during her sophomore year and scored eight points. She scored a career-high twenty-one points against the Ohio State Buckeyes in a game Stanford lost 94–82. She finished the year with an average of 3.3 points per game over 10.7 minutes per game and two games started, though she missed the last seven games of the season because of a left foot injury.

In her junior year, Wilson averaged 2.7 points per game over thirty-two games played and three games started as Stanford won the 2019 Pac-12 Conference women's basketball tournament but lost in the Elite Eight round of the 2019 NCAA Division I women's basketball tournament to the Notre Dame Fighting Irish 84–68. As a senior, she averaged 2.5 points per game in a bench role as Stanford lost in the final of the 2020 Pac-12 Conference tournament to the Oregon Ducks, and the NCAA tournament was cancelled due to the COVID-19 pandemic. Because of the health issues in her freshman year, she was granted another season of eligibility at Stanford under the NCAA's hardship wavier rule (Note: The hardship waiver rule states athletes may gain another year of eligibility by sustaining an injury or illness in the first half of the team's season, and only playing in up to thirty percent of the team's games.) after an appeal of an initial denial.

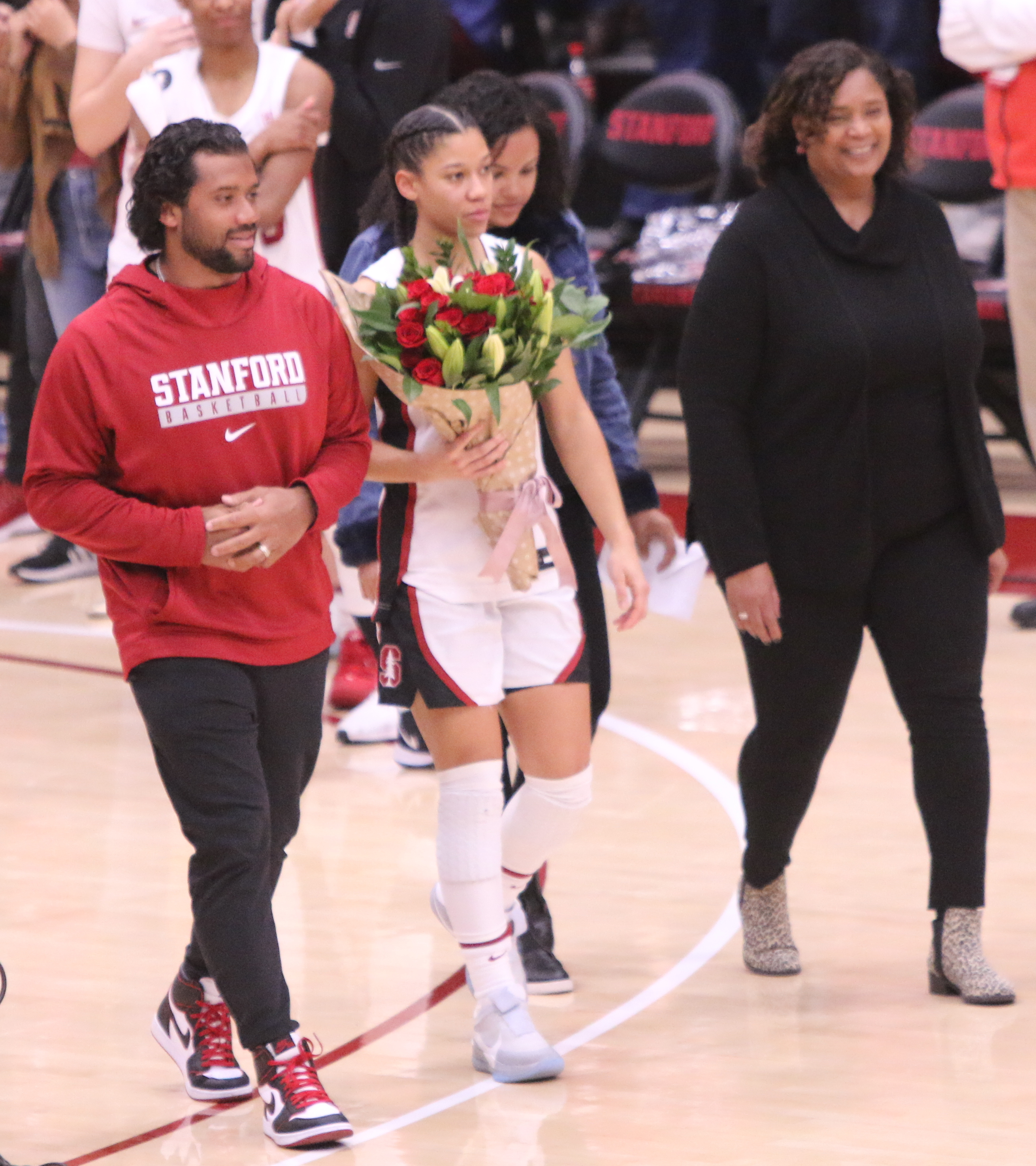
Wilson with family members at her senior day game in 2020

As a fifth-year senior, she started every game, and was noted for her defensive ability. She finished with career highs in minutes per game, at 23.6, field goal percentage, at .509, and rebounds per game, with 3.7. The Cardinal defeated the Arizona Wildcats 54–53 to win the 2021 NCAA Division I Women's Basketball Championship Game; Wilson, who started the game, played thirty-one minutes, accumulating five points, three assists and four rebounds. In March, Wilson was named Pac-12 Co-Defensive Player of the Year, along with Aari McDonald of Arizona. She was eligible to play a sixth season due to the COVID-19 pandemic, which shortened the 2020–2021 season, and, on May 10, she announced she would return for a sixth season at Stanford.

In her sixth season with the Cardinal, Wilson played in thirty-five games, with twenty-five starts and a new career-high 25.7 minutes per game. She played point guard along with Lacie Hull after the graduation of Kiana Williams. Facing the Washington Huskies, Wilson scored the go-ahead layup after stealing an inbound pass in a 63–56 Stanford win on February 26. She made the Pac-12 All-Defensive team for a second time and finished the season with 4.7 points and 2.9 rebounds per game as Stanford lost in the Final Four of the 2022 NCAA Division I women's basketball tournament to the UConn Huskies 63–58. She finished her college career with 160 games played, fourth-most in NCAA history and most in Stanford history as of April 2022. Wilson declared for the 2022 WNBA draft, in which teams in the Women's National Basketball Association (WNBA) select players to sign for their rosters, where she went unchosen.

== Career statistics ==
Legend
GP	Games played	GS	Games started	MPG	Minutes per game	RPG	Rebounds per game
APG	Assists per game	SPG	Steals per game	BPG	Blocks per game	PPG	Points per game
TO	Turnovers per game	FG%	Field-goal percentage	3P%	3-point field-goal percentage	FT%	Free-throw percentage
**Bold**	Career best	°	League leader

=== College ===
Year	Team	GP	GS	MPG	FG%	3P%	FT%	RPG	APG	SPG	BPG	TO	PPG
2016–17	Stanford	6	0	8.0	.462	**.500**	.333	1.0	0.8	0.5	0.0	1.2	2.8
2017–18	Stanford	21	2	10.7	.296	.290	.500	1.1	0.4	0.5	0.0	0.6	3.3
2018–19	Stanford	32	3	11.6	.403	.259	.643	1.5	0.7	0.7	0.0	**0.4**	2.7
2019–20	Stanford	33	0	14.0	.355	.293	.680	2.4	1.3	0.5	0.0	0.8	2.5
2020–21	Stanford	33	**33**	23.6	**.509**	.452	**.739**	**3.7**	2.1	**1.5**	0.1	0.7	4.6
2021–22	Stanford	**35**	25	**25.7**	.404	.270	.652	2.9	**2.4**	1.4	**0.3**	1.0	**4.7**
**Career**		160	63	17.3	.403	.318	.661	2.4	1.4	0.9	0.1	0.8	3.6

== Personal life ==
Wilson is the sister of NFL quarterback Russell Wilson. In addition to Russell, Anna has another brother, Harrison Wilson IV, who played college football and college baseball for the University of Richmond. She was an art practice major at Stanford for her undergraduate degree, and a media studies/communication major for her master's degree.
