= 2021–22 Arizona Wildcats women's basketball team =

American college basketball season

2021–22 Arizona Wildcats women's basketball

NCAA tournament, second round
- Conference: Pac-12 Conference

Ranking
- Coaches: No. 18
- AP: No. 19
- Record: 21–8 (10–6 Pac-12)
- Head coach: Adia Barnes (6th season)
- Assistant coaches: Ashley Davis (1st season); Salvo Coppa (6th season); Erin Grant (1st season)
- Home arena: McKale Center

2021–22 Pac-12 Conference women's basketball standings
	Conf.				Overall
Team	W		L	PCT	W		L	PCT
No. 2 Stanford †	16	–	0	1.000	32	–	4	.889
Oregon	11	–	6	.647	20	–	12	.625
Washington State	11	–	6	.647	19	–	11	.633
No. 19 Arizona	10	–	6	.625	21	–	8	.724
Colorado	9	–	7	.563	22	–	9	.710
Utah	8	–	7	.533	21	–	12	.636
UCLA	8	–	8	.500	18	–	13	.581
Oregon State	6	–	9	.400	17	–	14	.548
Arizona State	4	–	9	.308	12	–	14	.462
USC	5	–	12	.294	12	–	16	.429
California	2	–	10	.167	11	–	13	.458
Washington	2	–	12	.143	7	–	16	.304
† 2022 Pac-12 Tournament winner Rankings from AP poll

The 2021–22 Arizona Wildcats women's basketball team represented the University of Arizona during the 2021–22 NCAA Division I women's basketball season. The Wildcats were led by sixth-year head coach Adia Barnes. This was the Wildcats' 48th season at the on-campus McKale Center in Tucson, Arizona and 43rd season as a member of the Pac-12 Conference. They finished with a record of 21–8, 10–6 in Pac-12 play. The Wildcats were invited to the 2022 NCAA tournament where they defeated UNLV in the First Round before losing to North Carolina in the Second Round.

== Previous season ==
The Wildcats finished the season second behind Stanford in the Pacific-12 conference with a 13–4 record. They advanced to the semifinals of the 2021 Pac-12 women's tournament where they lost to no. 9 ranked UCLA and As a no. 3 seed in the NCAA tournament where they defeated Stony Brook and BYU in the first and second rounds, no. 4 ranked Texas A&M in the Sweet Sixteen, they won their region with a win over no. 12 ranked Indiana in the first-ever Elite Eight, knocked off no. 1 ranked UConn in the first-ever Final Four. Arizona reached the first-ever National Championship game, losing to no. 2 ranked Stanford (in a rematch from earlier this season) 54–53 and finishing the season with a 21–6 record.

== Offseason ==
=== Departures ===
Arizona Wildcats Departures
Name	Number	Pos.	Height	Year	Hometown	Notes
Trinity Baptiste	0	F	6'0	Senior	Tampa, Florida	
Aari McDonald	2	G	5'7	RS Senior	Fresno, California	
Tara Manumaleuga	3	G	5'10	Sophomore	Gold Coast, QLD, Australia	
Mara Mote	11	G	5'11	Sophomore	Cēsis, Latvia	
Marta Garcia	22	G	6'3	Freshman	Sevilla, Spain	

=== Transfers ===
Incoming transfers
Name	Number	Position	Height	Year	Hometown	Previous School	Remaining Eligibility	Notes
Taylor Chavez	3	G	5'10"	Junior	Surprise, AZ	Oregon	2	Transfer from Oregon.
Koi Love	5	F	6'0"	Sophomore	Orlando, FL	Vanderbilt	3	Transfer from Vanderbilt.
Ariyah Copeland	22	F	6'3"	Senior	Columbus, GA	Alabama	1	Transfer from Alabama.

=== 2021 recruiting class ===
College recruiting
Name	Hometown	School	Height	Weight	Commit date
Aaronette Vonleh; G	West Linn, OR	West Linn HS	6 ft 3 in (1.91 m)	N/A	Jul 11, 2020
Aaronette Vonleh; G	Recruit ratings: ESPN: (91)				
Anna Gret Asi; G	Tartu, Estonia	University of Tartu	5 ft 10 in (1.78 m)	N/A	Jul 13, 2020
Anna Gret Asi; G	Recruit ratings: No ratings found				
Gisela Sanchez; F	Barcelona, Spain	Segle XXI	6 ft 3 in (1.91 m)	N/A	Feb 11, 2021
Gisela Sanchez; F	Recruit ratings: No ratings found				
Overall recruit ranking:
Note: In many cases, Scout, Rivals, 247Sports, On3, and ESPN may conflict in their listings of height and weight.; In these cases, the average was taken. ESPN grades are on a 100-point scale.; Sources: "2021 Player Commits". ESPN.

==== 2022 recruiting class ====
College recruiting (2022)
Name	Hometown	School	Height	Weight	Commit date
Maya Nnaji; F	Lakeville, MN	Hopkins High School	6 ft 4 in (1.93 m)	N/A	May 10, 2021
Maya Nnaji; F	Recruit ratings: ESPN: (97)				
Paris Clark; G	Mount Vernon, NY	Long Island Lutheran High School	5 ft 8 in (1.73 m)	N/A	Dec 13, 2021
Paris Clark; G	Recruit ratings: ESPN: (96)				
Kailyn Gilbert; G	Tampa, FL	Seffner Christian Academy	5 ft 8 in (1.73 m)	N/A	Jan 6, 2021
Kailyn Gilbert; G	Recruit ratings: ESPN: (95)				
Lemyah Hylton; G	London, ON	Southwest Academy Girls Prep	5 ft 11 in (1.80 m)	N/A	Oct 16, 2021
Lemyah Hylton; G	Recruit ratings: ESPN: (91)				
Overall recruit ranking:
Note: In many cases, Scout, Rivals, 247Sports, On3, and ESPN may conflict in their listings of height and weight.; In these cases, the average was taken. ESPN grades are on a 100-point scale.; Sources: "2022 Player Commits". ESPN. Archived from the original on December 13, 2021.; "2022 Team Ranking". Rivals.

==== 2023 recruiting class ====
College recruiting (2023)
Name	Hometown	School	Height	Weight	Commit date
Breya Cunningham; POST	Chula Vista, CA	La Jolla Country Day School	6 ft 4 in (1.93 m)	N/A	Jun 26, 2022
Breya Cunningham; POST	Recruit ratings: ESPN: (97)				
Montaya Dew; F	Las Vegas, NV	Centennial High School	5 ft 11 in (1.80 m)	N/A	Dec 23, 2021
Montaya Dew; F	Recruit ratings: ESPN: (97)				
Overall recruit ranking:
Note: In many cases, Scout, Rivals, 247Sports, On3, and ESPN may conflict in their listings of height and weight.; In these cases, the average was taken. ESPN grades are on a 100-point scale.; Sources: "2023 Player Commits". ESPN. Archived from the original on June 26, 2022.; "2023 Team Ranking". Rivals.

== Preseason ==
=== Preseason rankings ===
- October 12 and November 3, 2021 - The Arizona Wildcats are picked to finish 5th in the both of Media and Coaches of the PAC-12 Preseason polls.
- October 19, 2021 - Arizona received No. 22 in the AP poll Top 25.
- November 3, 2021 – Arizona received No. 15 in the USA Today Coaches Poll Top 25.

=== Preseason awards watchlists ===
- October 26, 2021 – Taylor Chavez is named to the Ann Meyers Drysdale Award top 20 watch list (Best shooting guard)
- October 27, 2021 – Sam Thomas is named to the Cheryl Miller Award top 20 watch list (Best small forward)
- November 9, 2021 - Sam Thomas is named to the Naismith Trophy top 50 watchlist (the most outstanding female basketball player)

=== Preseason All Pac-12 teams ===
- November 3, 2021 – Preseason All-Pac-12 team: Sam Thomas and Cate Reese.

== Personal ==
=== Roster ===
2021–22 Arizona Wildcats women's basketball team
Players
Coaches

Pos.	#	Name	Height	Year	Previous school	Hometown
G	0	Anna Gret Asi	6 ft 5 in (1.96 m)	Fr	University of Tartu	Tartu, Estonia
G	1	Shaina Pellington	5 ft 8 in (1.73 m)	RS Sr	Dunabarton / Oklahoma	Pickering, ON
G	3	Taylor Chavez	5 ft 10 in (1.78 m)	Jr	Valley Vista /Oregon	Surprise, AZ
G	4	Madison Conner	5 ft 11 in (1.8 m)	Fr	AZ Compass Prep	Chandler, AZ
F	5	Koi Love	6 ft 0 in (1.83 m)	Fr	Miami Country Day School /Vanderbilt	Orlando, FL
G	10	Derin Erdoğan	5 ft 6 in (1.68 m)	So	İstanbul Üniversitesi SK	Istanbul, Turkey
G	13	Helena Pueyo	6 ft 3 in (1.91 m)	Jr	Segle XXI	Palma de Mallorca, Spain
F	14	Sam Thomas	6 ft 0 in (1.83 m)	GS	Centennial	Bloomfield Hills, MI
F	21	Aaronette Vonleh	6 ft 3 in (1.91 m)	Fr	West Linn	West Linn, OR
F	22	Ariyah Copeland	6 ft 3 in (1.91 m)	GS	Columbus /Alabama	Columbus, GA
G	23	Bendu Yeaney	5 ft 10 in (1.78 m)	Sr	St. Mary's /Indiana	Portland, OR
F	25	Cate Reese	6 ft 2 in (1.88 m)	Sr	Cypress	Cypress, TX
F	30	Gisela Sanchez	6 ft 3 in (1.91 m)	Fr	Segle XXI	Barcelona, Spain
F	32	Lauren Ware	6 ft 5 in (1.96 m)	So	Century	Bismarck, ND
C	34	Semaj Smith	6 ft 6 in (1.98 m)	Sr	St. Anthony	Long Beach, CA

Head coach

- Adia Barnes (Arizona)

Assistant coach(es)

- Ashley Davis (TCU)
- Salvo Coppa (IULM)
- Erin Grant (Texas Tech)

Legend

- (C) Team captain
- (S) Suspended
- (I) Ineligible
- (W) Walk-on
- Injured
- Current redshirt

Roster
Last update: November 3, 2021

=== Coaching staff ===
Name	Position	Year at Arizona	Alma Mater (year)
Adia Barnes	Head coach	6th	Arizona (1998)
Salvo Coppa	Assistant Coach	6th	IULM (2003)
Ashley Davis	Assistant Coach	1st	TCU (2007)
Erin Grant	Assistant Coach	1st	Texas Tech (2006)
Jessika Carrington	Director of Basketball Operations	6th	Oklahoma (2012)
Kortney Dunbar	Director of Players Recruiting	1st	Tennessee (2018)
Sierra Bone	Graduate Assistant	1st	Kansas City (2017)

== Schedule ==
Date time, TV	Rank^{#}	Opponent^{#}	Result	Record	High points	High rebounds	High assists	Site (attendance) city, state
Exhibition
October 28, 2021*; 6:00 pm	No. 22	Eastern New Mexico	W 84–25	–	12 – Tied	6 – Copeland	4 – Tied	McKale Center (5,948); Tucson, AZ
November 5, 2021*; 6:30 pm	No. 22	Arizona Christian	W 110–39	–	18 – Conner	12 – Reese	6 – Pueyo	McKale Center (6,124); Tucson, AZ
Regular Season
November 9, 2021*; 5:00 pm, live stream	No. 22	Cal State Northridge	W 87–44	1–0	14 – Tied	6 – Vonleh	5 – Pellington	McKale Center (6,154); Tucson, AZ
November 12, 2021*; 2:30 pm, ESPNU	No. 22	vs. No. 6 Louisville; Mammoth Sports Construction Invitational	W 61–59 ^{OT}	2–0	21 – Reese	10 – Ware	5 – Tied	Sanford Pentagon (2,345); Sioux Falls, SD
Nov. 15, 2021*; 6:30 p.m.	No. 11	Texas Southern	W 93–38	3–0	15 – Reese	11 – Reese	4 – Yeaney	McKale Center (6,261); Tucson, AZ
Nov. 19, 2021*; 6:30 p.m.	No. 11	Marist	W 78–36	4–0	14 – Thomas	9 – Love	4 – Pellington	McKale Center (6,787); Tucson, AZ
Nov. 25, 2021*; 1:15 p.m., ESPN3	No. 9	vs. Vanderbilt; Paradise Jam tournament	W 48–46	5–0	13 – Thomas	6 – Copeland	5 – Pueyo	Sports and Fitness Center (3,500); Saint Thomas, U.S. Virgin Islands
Nov. 26, 2021*; 1:15 p.m., ESPN3	No. 9	vs. DePaul; Paradise Jam Tournament	W 75–68	6–0	19 – Reese	8 – Reese	6 – Yeaney	Sports and Fitness Center (246); Saint Thomas, U.S. Virgin Islands
Nov. 27, 2021*; 1:15 p.m., ESPN3	No. 9	vs. Rutgers; Paradise Jam Tournament	W 80–44	7–0	16 – Reese	6 – Copeland	4 – Conner	Sports and Fitness Center (244); Saint Thomas, U.S. Virgin Islands
Dec. 3, 2021*; TBD	No. 7	at UC Riverside	Canceled due to COVID-19 protocols within the UC Riverside program. (Note: This game was canceled on November 24 due to COVID-19 protocols within the Highlanders program. This game was declared a no contest by the NCAA.)					SRC Arena; Riverside, CA
Dec. 9, 2021*; 6:30 p.m.	No. 6	North Dakota State	W 59–47	8–0	16 – Pellington	6 – Tied	3 – Tied	McKale Center (7,037); Tucson, AZ
Dec. 12, 2021*; 1:00 p.m.	No. 6	New Mexico	W 77–60	9–0	15 – Conner	12 – Reese	4 – Tied	McKale Center (8,884); Tucson, AZ
Dec. 17, 2021*; 4:00 p.m., ESPN+	No. 4	at Northern Arizona	W 82–55	10–0	17 – Vonleh	7 – Love	4 – Chavez	Walkup Skydome (572); Flagstaff, AZ
Dec. 19, 2021*; 3:30 p.m., ESPN	No. 4	vs. No. 11 Texas; Pac-12 Coast-to-Coast Challenge	Canceled due to COVID-19 protocols within the Arizona program. (Note: This game was canceled on December 18 due to COVID-19 protocols within the Wildcats program.)					T-Mobile Arena; Paradise, NV
Pac-12 regular season
January 7, 2022; 6:00 pm, P12N	No. 4	Washington State	W 60–52	11–0 (1–0)	20 – Reese	7 – Tied	8 – Thomas	McKale Center (7,378); Tucson, AZ
January 9, 2022; 12:00 pm, P12N	No. 4	Washington	Postponed due to COVID-19 protocols within the Washington program. (Note: This game was postponed on January 3 due to COVID-19 protocols within the Huskies program.)					McKale Center; Tucson, AZ
January 9, 2022 (Note: This game was originally scheduled on December 31 before being postponed and rescheduled to January 9 due to COVID-19 protocols within the USC program.); 4:00 pm, live stream	No. 4	at USC	L 67–76	11–1 (1–1)	29 – Reese	7 – Copeland	8 – Yeaney	Galen Center (0); Los Angeles, CA
January 13, 2022; 8:00 pm, P12N	No. 7	at Oregon State	W 55–53	12–1 (2–1)	15 – Yeaney	9 – Thomas	2 – Tied	Gill Coliseum (4,073); Corvallis, OR
January 15, 2022; 3:30 pm, P12N	No. 7	at Oregon	L 66–68 ^{OT}	12–2 (2–2)	14 – Tied	7 – Love	3 – Tied	Matthew Knight Arena (7,944); Eugene, OR
January 21, 2022; 7:00 pm, P12N	No. 10	Utah	W 76–64	13–2 (3–2)	25 – Thomas	7 – Ware	4 – Pueyo	McKale Center (7,099); Tucson, AZ
January 23, 2022; 12:00 pm, P12N	No. 10	No. 22 Colorado	W 75–56	14–2 (4–2)	28 – Pellington	9 – Reese	4 – Yeaney	McKale Center (7,103); Tucson, AZ
January 26, 2022 (Note: This game was originally scheduled on January 2 before being postponed and rescheduled to January 26 due to COVID-19 protocols within the UCLA program.); 6:00 pm, P12N	No. 8	at UCLA	W 74–63	15–2 (5–2)	20 – Pellington	10 – Reese	4 – Tied	Pauley Pavilion (826); Los Angeles, CA
January 28, 2022; 8:00 pm, P12N	No. 8	at California	Postponed due to COVID-19 protocols within the California program. (Note: This game was postponed on January 24 due to COVID-19 protocols within the Golden Bears program.)					Haas Pavilion; Berkeley, CA
January 30, 2022; 2:00 pm, ESPN2	No. 8	at No. 2 Stanford	L 69–75	15–3 (5–3)	17 – Reese	7 – Reese	5 – Tied	Maples Pavilion (3,479); Stanford, CA
February 4, 2022; 8:00 pm, P12N	No. 8	No. 19 Oregon	W 63–48	16–3 (6–3)	13 – Reese	9 – Love	4 – Tied	McKale Center (10,413); Tucson, AZ
February 6, 2022; 12:00 pm, P12N	No. 8	Oregon State	W 73–61	17–3 (7–3)	19 – Reese	8 – Reese	3 – Tied	McKale Center (7,505); Tucson, AZ
February 11, 2022; 7:00 pm, P12N	No. 6	at Arizona State; Territorial Cup	L 77–81	17–4 (7–4)	30 – Pellington	8 – Reese	5 – Pellington	Desert Financial Arena (5,193); Tempe, AZ
February 13, 2022; 12:00 pm, P12N	No. 6	Arizona State; Territorial Cup	W 62–58	18–4 (8–4)	17 – Reese	6 – Love	3 – Tied	McKale Center (8,480); Tucson, AZ
February 18, 2022; 8:00 pm, P12N	No. 8	at Washington	W 51–42	19–4 (9–4)	10 – Pellington	8 – Ware	3 – Yeaney	Alaska Airlines Arena (1,499); Seattle, WA
February 20, 2022; 1:00 pm, P12N	No. 8	at Washington State	L 67–72	19–5 (9–5)	15 – Conner	4 – Tied	3 – Thomas	Beasley Coliseum (984); Pullman, WA
February 24, 2022; 7:00 pm, P12N	No. 12	UCLA	L 46–64	19–6 (9–6)	14 – Pellington	6 – Copeland	4 – Pueyo	McKale Center (8,067); Tucson, AZ
February 26, 2022; 12:00 pm, P12N	No. 12	USC	W 68–59	20–6 (10–6)	18 – Chavez	11 – Ware	4 – Pellington	McKale Center (8,256); Tucson, AZ
Pac-12 Women's tournament
March 3, 2022; 1:00 pm, P12N	(4) No. 14	vs. (5) Colorado; Quarterfinals	L 43–45	20–7	15 – Ware	8 – Ware	3 – Pueyo	Michelob Ultra Arena (4,122); Paradise, NV
NCAA tournament
March 19, 2022; 7:00 pm, ESPN2	(4 G) No. 19	(13 G) UNLV; First Round	W 72–67	21–7	30 – Pellington	7 – Ware	4 – Pellington	McKale Center (9,573); Tucson, AZ
March 21, 2022; 7:00 pm, ESPN2	(4 G) No. 19	(5 G) No. 17 North Carolina; Second Round	L 45–63	21–8	15 – Thomas	7 – Ware	3 – Tied	McKale Center (8,333); Tucson, AZ
*Non-conference game. ^{#}Rankings from AP Poll. (#) Tournament seedings in parentheses. G=Greensboro. All times are in Mountain Time.

== Game summaries ==
This section will be filled in as the season progresses.

=== vs Cal State Northridge ===
TBD

November 9
5:00 p.m.

Cal State Northridge Matadors 47, No. 22 Arizona Wildcats 88
Scoring by quarter: 5–15, 13–32, 12–19, 14–21
Pts: Kayanna Spriggs, 9 Rebs: Kayanna Spriggs, 6 Asts: Tied, 2	Pts: Tied, 14; Rebs: Aaronette Vonleh, 6 Asts: Shania Pellington, 6

McKale Center, Tucson, AZ
Attendance: 6,154
Referees: Melissa Barlow, Brian Woods, Sha'Rae Mitchell

=== vs No. 6 Louisville ===
ESPNU

November 12
2:30 p.m.

No. 6 Louisville Cardinals 59, No. 22 Arizona Wildcats 61 (OT)
Scoring by quarter: 9–8, 13–17, 18–16, 14–13, Overtime: 5–7
Pts: Hailey Van Lith, 19; Rebs: Emily Engstler, 8 Asts: Chelsie Hall, 3	Pts: Cate Reese, 21; Rebs: Lauren Ware, 10; Asts: Helena Pueyo, 5

Sanford Pentagon, Sioux Falls, SD
Attendance: 2,345
Referees: Roy Gulbeyan, Maj Forsberg, Katie Lukanich

=== vs Texas Southern ===
TBD

November 15
6:30 p.m.

Texas Southern Lady Tigers 38, No. 11 Arizona Wildcats 93
Scoring by quarter: 9–24, 6–24, 6–17, 17–28
Pts: Niya Mitchell, 12; Rebs: Niya Mitchell, 10; Asts: Ashley Austin, 2	Pts: Cate Reese, 15; Rebs: Cate Reese, 11; Asts: Bendy Yeaney, 4

McKale Center, Tucson, AZ
Attendance: 6,261
Referees: Anita Ortega, Kenneth Nash, Stacie Blow

=== vs Marist ===
TBD

November 19
6:30 p.m.

Marist Red Wolves 36, No. 11 Arizona Wildcats 78
Scoring by quarter: 14–12, 8–20, 5–26, 9–20
Pts: Kendall Krick, 8 Rebs: Emma Wax, 4 Asts: Emma Wax, 2	Pts: Sam Thomas, 14; Rebs: Koi Love, 9 Asts: Shania Pellington, 4

McKale Center, Tucson, AZ
Attendance: 6,787
Referees: Michael Price, Marc Merritt, Cheryl Flores

=== vs Vanderbilt ===
ESPN3

November 25
1:15 p.m.

Vanderbilt Commodores 46, No. 9 Arizona Wildcats 48
Scoring by quarter: 7–11, 9–13, 11–14, 19–10
Pts: Iyana Moore, 10; Rebs: 2 Tied, 6 Asts: 2 Tied, 2	Pts: Sam Thomas, 13; Rebs: Ariyah Copeland, 6 Asts: Helena Pueyo, 5

Sports and Fitness Center, Saint Thomas, U.S. Virgin Islands
Attendance: 3,500
Referees: Rod Creech, Karlenna Tobin, Sarah Williams

=== vs DePaul ===
ESPN3

November 26
1:15 p.m.

No. 9 Arizona Wildcats 75, DePaul Blue Demons 68
Scoring by quarter: 19-17, 17-17, 15-17, 24-17
Pts: Cate Reese, 19; Rebs: Cate Reese, 8 Asts: Bendu Yeaney, 6	Pts: Aneesah Morrow, 24; Rebs: Aneesah Morrow, 16; Asts: Sonya Morris, 4

Sports and Fitness Center, Saint Thomas, U.S. Virgin Islands
Attendance: 246
Referees: Rod Creech, Jeffrey Smith, Krystle Apellaniz

=== vs Rutgers ===
ESPN3

November 27
1:15 p.m.

Rutgers Scarlet Knights 44, No. 9 Arizona Wildcats 80
Scoring by quarter: 2–12, 6–34, 16–15, 20–19
Pts: Oshlynn Brown, 9 Rebs: Tied, 5 Asts: Tied, 1	Pts: Cate Reese, 16; Rebs: Ariyah Copeland, 6 Asts: Madison Conner, 4

Sports and Fitness Center, Saint Thomas, U.S. Virgin Islands
Attendance: 244
Referees: Bruce Morris, Karleena Tobin, Tim Resch

=== vs North Dakota State ===
November 27
6:30 p.m.

North Dakota State Bison vs. Arizona Wildcats

McKale Center, Tucson, AZ

=== vs New Mexico ===
December 12

New Mexico Lobos vs. Arizona Wildcats

McKale Center, Tucson, AZ

== Player statistics ==
Player	Games Played	Minutes	Field Goals	Three Pointers	Free Throws	Rebounds	Assists	Blocks	Steals	Points
Cate Reese	5	84	19	4	13	25	4	2	1	55
Lauren Ware	5	83	14	2	9	25	3	10	2	37
Sam Thomas	5	80	12	6	13	9	7	6	4	32
Shaina Pellington	5	79	5	1	4	12	14	0	5	17
Bendu Yeaney	5	76	12	5	1	10	12	0	7	30
Taylor Chavez	0	0	0	0	0	0	0	0	0	0
Madison Conner	0	0	0	0	0	0	0	0	0	0
Ariyah Copeland	0	0	0	0	0	0	0	0	0	0
Derin Erdogan	0	0	0	0	0	0	0	0	0	0
Anna Gret Asi	0	0	0	0	0	0	0	0	0	0
Koi Love	0	0	0	0	0	0	0	0	0	0
Helena Pueyo	0	0	0	0	0	0	0	0	0	0
Gisela Sanchez	0	0	0	0	0	0	0	0	0	0
Semaj Smith	0	0	0	0	0	0	0	0	0	0
Aaronette Vonleh	0	0	0	0	0	0	0	0	0	0
Total	–	–	–	–	–	–	–	–	–	–
Opponents	–	–	–	–	−	−	−	−	−	−

== Awards & milestones ==
=== Season highs ===
==== Players ====
- Points: C. Reese, 21 (Louisville)
- Rebounds: C. Reese, 11 (Texas Southern)
- Assists: Tied, 5 (Cal State Northridge & Louisville)
- Steals: K. Love, 4 (Texas Southern & Marist)
- Blocks: L. Ware, 4 (Marist)
- Minutes: C. Reese, 33 (Louisville)

==== Team ====
- Points: 93 (Texas Southern)
- Field Goals: 36 (Texas Southern)
- Field Goal Attempts: 67 (Texas Southern)
- 3 Point Field Goals Made: 11 (Marist)
- 3 Point Field Goals Attempts: 24 (Marist)
- Free Throws Made:12 (Louisville)
- Free Throws Attempts:14 (Louisville)
- Rebounds:53 (Marist)
- Assists:27 (Cal State Northridge)
- Steals:15 (Texas Southern)
- Blocked Shots:10 (Marist)
- Turnovers:17 (Louisville)
- Fouls:21 (Louisville)

=== Weekly awards ===
Cate Reese

- Pac-12 Women's Basketball Player of the Week 1 (Nov. 15)

== Rankings ==
Ranking movements Legend: ██ Increase in ranking ██ Decrease in ranking т = Tied with team above or below ( ) = First-place votes
	Week																				
Poll	Pre	1	2	3	4	5	6	7	8	9	10	11	12	13	14	15	16	17	18	19	Final
AP	22	22*	11	9	7	6	4	4	4	4 (3)	7	10	8	8	6	8	12	14т	20	19	Not released
Coaches	15	15*	15^	12	11	10	8	5	5	5 (1)	7	9	8	8	7	7	11	13	16	16	18

*The preseason and week 1 polls were the same.
^Coaches poll was not released for Week 2.

== See also ==
- 2021–22 Arizona Wildcats men's basketball team
