= Esmery Martínez =

Dominican basketball player (born 2000)

Personal information
- Born: 1 May 2000 (age 26) Hato Mayor del Rey, Dominican Republic
- Listed height: 6 ft 3 in (1.91 m)

Career information
- High school: Hamilton Heights Christian Academy (Chattanooga, Tennessee)
- College: West Virginia (2019–2022); Arizona (2022–2024)
- WNBA draft: 2024: 2nd round, 17th overall pick
- Drafted by: New York Liberty
- Playing career: 2024–present
- Position: Forward

Career history
- 2024–2025: Flammes Carolo Basket

Career highlights
- First-team All-Big 12 (2021)
- Stats at Basketball Reference

Esmery Martínez (born 1 May 2000) is a Dominican professional basketball player who was drafted by the New York Liberty of the Women's National Basketball Association (WNBA) 17th overall in the 2024 WNBA draft. She played college basketball at West Virginia and Arizona. She is also a member of the Dominican Republic women's national basketball team.

== Early life ==
Martínez attended Hamilton Heights Christian Academy in Chattanooga, Tennessee, where she averaged 18.3 points, 14.3 rebounds and 5.9 blocks per game during her career. She helped the program finish as the runner-up at the 2018 Geico High School Nationals Tournament and was named to the all-tournament team.

== College career ==
Martínez began her college basketball career at West Virginia during the 2019–20 season. During her freshman year she played in all 29 games and averaged 5.4 points and 6.8 rebounds per game. During the 2020–21 season, in her sophomore year, she started all 29 games for the Mountaineers and averaged a double-double, with 13.6 points and 11.6 rebounds per game. She finished the season with a team-high 335 rebounds, the fifth-most in program history. Following the season she was named first-team All-Big 12. During the 2021–22 season, in her junior year, she started 28 games, and averaged 11.3 points and 8.8 rebounds while playing 26.3 minutes per game. Following the season she was named second-team All-Big 12.

On 5 April 2022, Martínez entered the NCAA transfer portal. On 24 April 2022, she signed with LSU. On 4 May 2022, she transferred to Arizona for the 2022–23 season. During her senior year she started all 32 games and averaged 10.5 points and 8.6 rebounds per game. Her 274 rebounds were the eighth-most in a single season in Arizona program history. She finished second in the Pac-12 in offensive rebounds with 97 and was named an All-Pac 12 honorable mention. Following the season she was named a top-ten finalist for the Katrina McClain Award. She initially declared for the 2023 WNBA draft and entered the NCAA transfer portal, however, she later withdrew her name from the WNBA draft and announced she would return to Arizona for a fifth year. During the 2023–24 season, as a graduate student, she played in 33 games, with 32 starts, and averaged 11.1 points, 6.3 rebounds, 2.2 assists and 2.0 steals per game. Following the season she was named a Pac-12 All-Defensive Team honorable mention and to the All-Pac-12 team by the media.

== Professional career ==
=== WNBA ===
On 15 April 2024, Martínez was drafted in the second round, 17th overall, by the New York Liberty in the 2024 WNBA draft. She became the first Dominican-born player to be selected in the WNBA draft. On 13 May 2024, she was waived by the Liberty.

On 1 February 2025, Martínez signed a training camp contract with the Liberty.

=== Europe ===
On 19 June 2024, Martínez signed with the Flammes Carolo Basket of the Ligue Féminine de Basketball. Martínez left the team in April 2025, activating her release clause after she signed a training camp contract with the Liberty.

== National team career ==
Martínez made her international debut for the Dominican Republic at the 2018 FIBA Caribbean Women's Championship where she averaged 8.8 points and 5.3 rebounds per game.

She made her senior national team debut for the Dominican Republic at the 2023 FIBA Women's AmeriCup where she appeared in two games and averaged nine points, seven rebounds and two assists per game.

== Career statistics ==
Legend
GP	Games played	GS	Games started	MPG	Minutes per game	RPG	Rebounds per game
APG	Assists per game	SPG	Steals per game	BPG	Blocks per game	PPG	Points per game
TO	Turnovers per game	FG%	Field-goal percentage	3P%	3-point field-goal percentage	FT%	Free-throw percentage
**Bold**	Career best	°	League leader

=== College ===
Year	Team	GP	GS	MPG	FG%	3P%	FT%	RPG	APG	SPG	BPG	TO	PPG
2019–20	West Virginia	29	0	17.4	46.3	6.7	51.5	6.8	0.5	0.9	0.4	**1.8**	5.4
2020–21	West Virginia	29	29	**31.4**	49.0	25.0	75.4	**11.6**	1.8	1.9	**1.1**	2.6	**13.6**
2021–22	West Virginia	29	28	26.3	43.4	**40.0**	73.3	8.8	1.7	1.6	0.9	3.0	11.3
2022–23	Arizona	32	32	25.8	**50.6**	33.3	71.2	8.6	1.8	1.6	0.6	2.1	10.5
2023–24	Arizona	**33**	32	27.5	43.5	26.1	**78.1**	6.3	**2.2**	**2.0**	0.5	2.6	11.1
**Career**		152	121	25.8	46.4	29.6	72.5	8.3	1.6	1.6	0.7	2.4	10.4
Statistics retrieved from Sports-Reference.
