= 2018 McDonald's All-American Girls Game =

Basketball game

West	East
82	79
- Date: March 28, 2018
- Venue: State Farm Arena, Atlanta, Georgia
- MVP: Christyn Williams
- Network: ESPN

McDonald's All-American

The 2018 McDonald's All-American Girls Game was an all-star basketball game that was played on March 28, 2018, at State Farm Arena in Atlanta, Georgia. The game's rosters featured the best and most highly recruited high school girls graduating in the class of 2018. The game will be the 16th annual version of the McDonald's All-American Game first played in 2002. The 24 players were selected from over 700 nominees by a committee of basketball experts. They were chosen not only for their on-court skills, but for their performances off the court as well.

== Rosters ==
The roster was announced on January 16, 2018. Baylor had the most selections with four. Tennessee followed behind with three.

=== Team East ===
ESPNW 100 Rank	Name	Height	Position	Hometown	High school	College choice
4	Shakira Austin	6–5	F	Fredericksburg, Virginia	Riverdale Baptist School	Maryland
18	Jenna Brown	5–10	PG	Atlanta, Georgia	The Lovett School	Stanford
49	Amira Collins	6–4	P	Slidell, Louisiana	Paul VI Catholic	Tennessee
9	Emily Engstler	6–2	W	New York, New York	Saint Francis Prep	Syracuse
6	Destanni Henderson	5–8	PG	Fort Myers, Florida	Fort Myers	South Carolina
25	Jazmine Massengill	6–0	PG	Chattanooga, Tennessee	Hamilton Heights Christian Academy	Tennessee
63	Valencia Myers	6–3	P	Solon, Ohio	Solon	Florida State
5	Olivia Nelson-Ododa	6–4	P	Winder, Georgia	Winder-Barrow	UConn
16	Izabela Nicoletti	5–10	G	São Paulo, Brazil	Neuse Christian Academy	Florida State
38	Jordan Nixon	5–8	PG	New York, New York	The Mary Louis Academy	Notre Dame
8	Sedona Prince	6–7	P	Liberty Hill, Texas	Liberty Hill	Texas
24	Madison Williams	5–10	W	Fort Worth, Texas	Trinity Valley School	Oklahoma

=== Team West ===
ESPNW 100 Rank	Name	Height	Position	Hometown	High school	College choice
15	Elizabeth Balogun	6–0	W	Lagos, Nigeria	Hamilton Heights Christian Academy	Georgia Tech
2	Charli Collier	6–5	F	Mont Belvieu, Texas	Barbers Hill	Texas
3	Aquira DeCosta	6–2	W	Derby, Kansas	Saint Mary's (Stockton, CA)	Baylor
19	Elizabeth Dixon	6–3	F	Memphis, Tennessee	Ridgeway High School (TN)	Georgia Tech
7	Queen Egbo	6–3	P	Houston, Texas	Travis High School	Baylor
35	McKenzie Forbes	6–0	W	Folsom, California	Folsom	California
27	Katlyn Gilbert	5–10	PG	Santa Cruz, California	Heritage Christian (IN)	Notre Dame
10	Zarielle Green	6–0	G	Duncanville, Texas	Duncanville	Tennessee
12	Catherine Reese	6–2	F	Cypress, Texas	Cypress Woods	Arizona
20	Honesty Scott-Grayson	5–10	PG	Brick, New Jersey	Riverdale Baptist School	UCLA
13	NaLyssa Smith	6–2	F	Converse, Texas	East Central (TX)	Baylor
1	Christyn Williams	5–11	G	Little Rock, Arkansas	Central Arkanas Christian School	UConn
