= Shaina Pellington =

Canadian basketball player

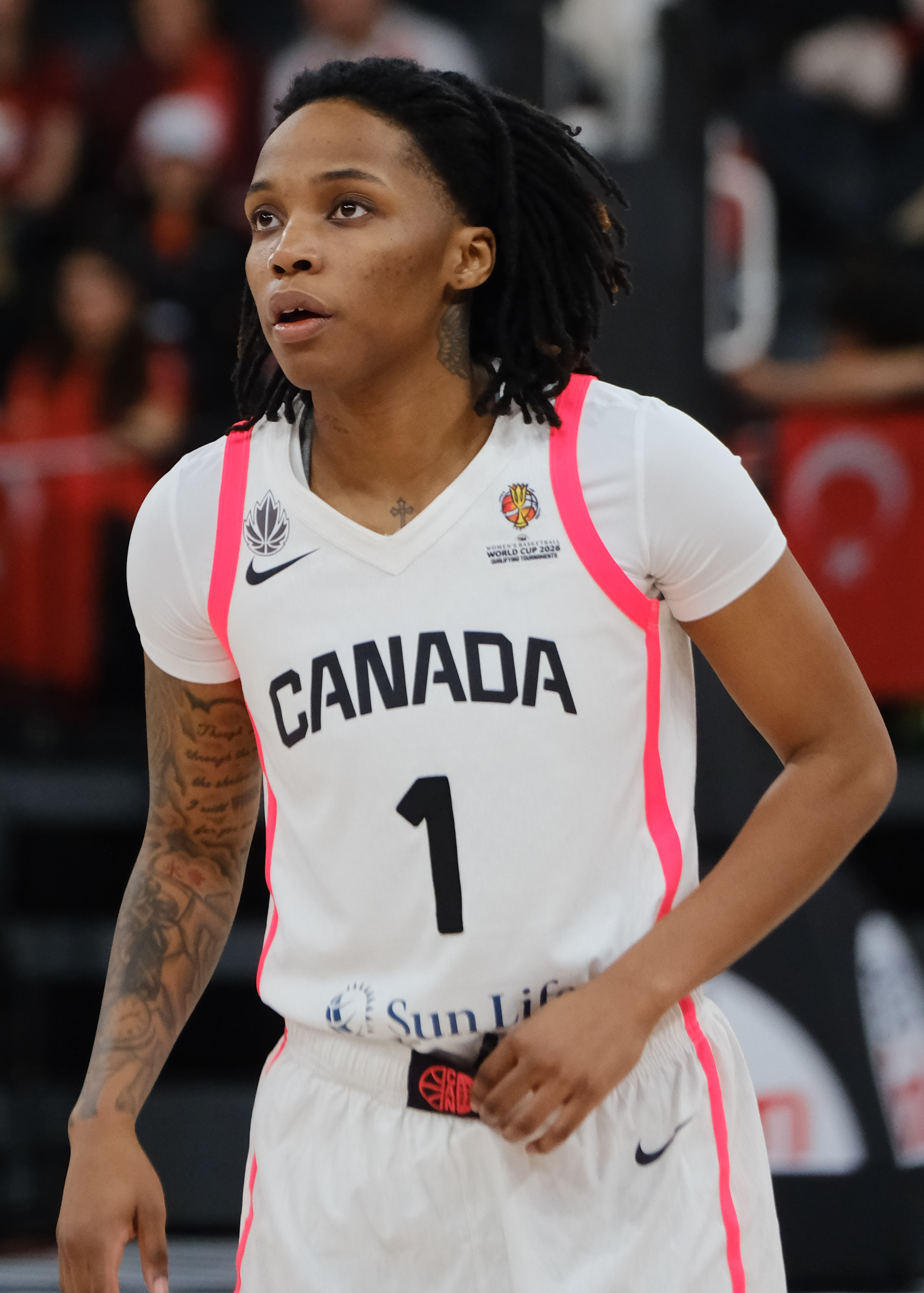

Personal information
- Born: June 1, 1999 (age 27) Toronto, Ontario, Canada
- Listed height: 5 ft 8 in (1.73 m)
- Listed weight: 168 lb (76 kg)

Career information
- High school: Dunbarton HS (Pickering, Ontario)
- College: Oklahoma (2017–2019); Arizona (2020–present)
- Position: Point guard
- Number: 1

Career highlights
- Pac-12 Most Improved Player of the Year (2023); All-Pac 12 Defensive Team (2023); All-Pac 12 Team 2023); Big 12 Freshman of the Year (2018); Big 12 All-Freshman Team (2018)

Shaina Pellington (born June 1, 1999) is a Canadian basketball player for the Arizona Wildcats of the Pac-12 Conference.

She played for the Canada Women's National Basketball team. She competed at the 2020 Summer Olympics.

She participated at the 2021 FIBA Women's AmeriCup.

== College ==
She began her US college basketball career at the University of Oklahoma in 2017, playing there two seasons until transferring to the University of Arizona. After sitting out the 2019–20 season due to NCAA transfer rules, she became a key substitute for a Wildcats team that went on to narrowly lose in the national championship game to conference rival Stanford.

== Career statistics ==
Legend
GP	Games played	GS	Games started	MPG	Minutes per game	RPG	Rebounds per game
APG	Assists per game	SPG	Steals per game	BPG	Blocks per game	PPG	Points per game
TO	Turnovers per game	FG%	Field-goal percentage	3P%	3-point field-goal percentage	FT%	Free-throw percentage
**Bold**	Career best	°	League leader

=== College ===
Year	Team	GP	GS	MPG	FG%	3P%	FT%	RPG	APG	SPG	BPG	TO	PPG
2017–18	Oklahoma	**31**	20	27.3	49.2	0.0	59.1	2.7	2.2	0.8	0.1	2.9	13.1
2018–19	Oklahoma	23	12	23.3	41.1	13.7	60.6	**3.6**	2.8	1.0	0.2	**3.1**	13.0
2020–21	Arizona	27	3	15.6	39.5	5.3	45.0	1.9	1.0	0.6	0.1	1.0	5.8
2021–22	Arizona	27	27	24.0	43.7	**26.2**	**64.0**	2.5	2.4	1.5	0.0	1.6	11.3
2022–23	Arizona	30	**29**	**27.9**	**53.7**	20.0	63.5	3.0	**3.6**	**1.8**	**0.3**	1.7	**13.4**
**Career**		138	91	23.8	46.3	17.1	60.0	2.7	2.4	1.2	0.1	2.0	11.4
Statistics retrieved from Sports-Reference.

== Personal life ==
She is openly lesbian.
