= Madison Conner =

American basketball player (born 2003)

Personal information
- Born: July 29, 2003 (age 23) Chandler, Arizona, US
- Listed height: 5 ft 11 in (1.80 m)

Career information
- High school: Perry (Gilbert, Arizona); AZ Compass Prep (Chandler, Arizona)
- College: Arizona (2021–2023); TCU (2023–2025)
- WNBA draft: 2025: 3rd round, 29th overall pick
- Drafted by: Seattle Storm
- Position: Guard

Career highlights
- First-team All-Big 12 (2025)
- Stats at Basketball Reference

Madison Conner (born July 29, 2003) is an American professional basketball player. She played college basketball for the Arizona Wildcats and TCU Horned Frogs. Conner was selected by the Seattle Storm in the 2025 WNBA draft.

== High school career ==
Conner attended Perry High School in Gilbert, Arizona for three years. During her junior year, she averaged 20 points, 7.0 rebounds, and 3.2 assists per game, leading Perry to a 21-8 record. On June 20, 2020, she committed to Arizona.

== College career ==
Conner opted to enroll early at Arizona and joined the team on January 15, 2021. She played in 28 games off the bench, averaging 12.2 minutes per game. She scored a career-high 16 points in a win over Arizona State. In her sophomore year, Conner averaged 5.8 points per game. She scored a career-high 22 points against California Baptist and made a career-high five three-pointers. She led the team in free throw and three-point percentage.

In April 2023, Conner transferred to TCU. In her junior year, she averaged 19.2 points, 4.7 rebounds, 3.0 assists and 1.2 steals, and was named to the All-Big 12 second team. She scored a career-high 41 points against Tulsa. Conner missed several games after tearing her MCL in practice. As a senior, Conner led the NCAA in three-pointers made. She averaged 14.4 points, 4 rebounds, and 3.6 assists per game. Conner earned first-team honors and was named as a top 10 finalist for the Ann Meyers Drysdale Award. She helped lead the Horned Frogs to their first Elite Eight in program history.

== Professional career ==
On April 14, 2025, Conner was selected with the 34th overall pick by the Seattle Storm in the third round of the 2025 WNBA draft. On May 6, 2025, Conner was waived by the Storm.

== Career statistics ==
Legend
GP	Games played	GS	Games started	MPG	Minutes per game	RPG	Rebounds per game
APG	Assists per game	SPG	Steals per game	BPG	Blocks per game	PPG	Points per game
TO	Turnovers per game	FG%	Field-goal percentage	3P%	3-point field-goal percentage	FT%	Free-throw percentage
**Bold**	Career best	°	League leader

=== College ===
Year	Team	GP	GS	MPG	FG%	3P%	FT%	RPG	APG	SPG	BPG	TO	PPG
2020–22	Arizona	6	0	5.5	28.6	28.6	0.0	0.7	0.2	0.2	0.0	**0.2**	1.0
2021–22	Arizona	28	0	12.1	37.5	35.5	88.2	0.8	0.8	0.6	0.0	0.7	5.1
2022–23	Arizona	32	1	14.3	36.4	37.2	**93.8**	1.6	0.8	0.5	0.1	0.8	5.8
2023–24	TCU	27	27	**35.1**	38.4	38.6	84.4	**4.7**	3.0	**1.2**	**0.3**	2.8	**19.2**
2024–25	TCU	**38**	**37**	32.8	**44.6**	**44.9**	81.9	4.0	**3.6**	0.9	0.2	2.3	14.4
**Career**		131	65	23.1	40.2	40.4	85.8	2.7	2.0	0.8	0.2	1.6	10.7
