= 2022–23 Arizona Wildcats women's basketball team =

American college basketball season

2022–23 Arizona Wildcats women's basketball

NCAA tournament, Second Round
- Conference: Pac-12 Conference

Ranking
- AP: No. 25
- Record: 22–10 (11–7 Pac-12)
- Head coach: Adia Barnes (7th season)
- Assistant coaches: Ashley Davis (2nd season); Salvo Coppa (7th season); Erin Grant (2nd season)
- Home arena: McKale Center

2022–23 Pac-12 Conference women's basketball standings
	Conf.				Overall
Team	W		L	PCT	W		L	PCT
No. 8 Utah	15	–	3	.833	27	–	5	.844
No. 5 Stanford	15	–	3	.833	29	–	6	.829
No. 21 Colorado	13	–	5	.722	25	–	9	.735
No. 14 UCLA	11	–	7	.611	27	–	10	.730
No. 25 Arizona	11	–	7	.611	22	–	10	.688
USC	11	–	7	.611	21	–	10	.677
No. 23 Washington State †	9	–	9	.500	23	–	11	.676
Oregon	7	–	11	.389	20	–	15	.571
Washington	7	–	11	.389	19	–	15	.559
California	4	–	14	.222	13	–	17	.433
Oregon State	4	–	14	.222	13	–	18	.419
Arizona State	1	–	17	.056	8	–	20	.286
† 2023 Pac-12 Tournament winner Rankings from AP poll

The 2022–23 Arizona Wildcats women's basketball team represented the University of Arizona during the 2022–23 NCAA Division I women's basketball season. The Wildcats were led by seventh-year head coach Adia Barnes. This was the Wildcats' 49th season at the on-campus McKale Center in Tucson, Arizona and 44th season as a member of the Pac-12 Conference.

== Previous season ==
The Wildcats finished the 2021–22 season with a record of 21–8, 10–6 in Pac-12 play. The Wildcats were invited to the 2022 NCAA tournament where they defeated UNLV in the first round before losing to North Carolina in the second round.

== Offseason ==
=== Departures ===
Arizona Wildcats Departures
Name	Number	Pos.	Height	Year	Hometown	Notes
Sam Thomas	14	F	6'0	Graduate Student	Bloomfield Hills, MI	Completed college eligibility
Ariyah Copeland	22	F	6'3	Graduate Student	Columbus, GA	Completed college eligibility

==== Outgoing transfers ====
Arizona Outcoming Transfers
Name	Number	Pos.	Height	Year	Hometown	New School	Source
Anna Gret Asi	0	G	5'8	Freshman	Tartu, Estonia	Transferred to Oklahoma State	
Koi Love	5	F	6'0	Junior	Orlando, FL	Transferred to USC	
Derin Erdoğan	10	G	5'6	Sophomore	Istanbul, Turkey	Transferred to Northeastern	
Aaronette Vonleh	21	C	6'3	Freshman	West Linn, OR	Transferred to Colorado	
Gisela Sanchez	30	F	6'3	Freshman	Barcelona, Spain	Transferred to Kansas State	
Semaj Smith	34	C	6'6	Senior	Long Beach, CA	Transferred to San Jose State	
Bendu Yeaney	23	G	5'10	Senior	Portland, OR	Transferred to Oregon State	
Taylor Chavez	3	G	5'10	Senior	Surprise, AZ	TBD	

=== Acquisitions ===
==== Incoming transfers ====
Arizona incoming transfers
Name	Number	Pos.	Height	Year	Hometown	Previous School	Years Remaining	Date Eligible	Source
Lauren Fields	23	G	5'9	Junior	Shawnee, OK	Oklahoma State	1		
Esmery Martínez	12	F	6'2	Junior	Hato Mayor del Ray, DR	West Virginia	1		
Jade Loville	30	F/G	5'11	Graduate Student	Scottsdale, AZ	Arizona State	1		

==== 2022 recruiting class ====
College recruiting
Name	Hometown	School	Height	Weight	Commit date
Maya Nnaji; F	Lakeville, MN	Hopkins High School	6 ft 4 in (1.93 m)	N/A	May 10, 2021
Maya Nnaji; F	Recruit ratings: ESPN: (97)				
Paris Clark; G	Mount Vernon, NY	Long Island Lutheran High School	5 ft 8 in (1.73 m)	N/A	Dec 13, 2021
Paris Clark; G	Recruit ratings: ESPN: (96)				
Kailyn Gilbert; G	Tampa, FL	Seffner Christian Academy	5 ft 8 in (1.73 m)	N/A	Jan 6, 2021
Kailyn Gilbert; G	Recruit ratings: ESPN: (95)				
Lemyah Hylton; G	London, ON	Southwest Academy Girls Prep	5 ft 11 in (1.80 m)	N/A	Oct 16, 2021
Lemyah Hylton; G	Recruit ratings: ESPN: (91)				
Overall recruit ranking:
Note: In many cases, Scout, Rivals, 247Sports, On3, and ESPN may conflict in their listings of height and weight.; In these cases, the average was taken. ESPN grades are on a 100-point scale.; Sources: "2022 Player Commits". ESPN. Archived from the original on December 13, 2021.; "2022 Team Ranking". Rivals.

==== 2023 recruiting class ====
College recruiting (2023)
Name	Hometown	School	Height	Weight	Commit date
Breya Cunningham; POST	Chula Vista, CA	La Jolla Country Day School	6 ft 4 in (1.93 m)	N/A	Jun 26, 2022
Breya Cunningham; POST	Recruit ratings: ESPN: (97)				
Montaya Dew; F	Las Vegas, NV	Centennial High School	5 ft 11 in (1.80 m)	N/A	Dec 23, 2021
Montaya Dew; F	Recruit ratings: ESPN: (97)				
Jada Williams; PG	Kansas City, MO	La Jolla Country Day School (CA)	5 ft 6 in (1.68 m)	N/A	Aug 1, 2022
Jada Williams; PG	Recruit ratings: ESPN: (96)				
Overall recruit ranking:
Note: In many cases, Scout, Rivals, 247Sports, On3, and ESPN may conflict in their listings of height and weight.; In these cases, the average was taken. ESPN grades are on a 100-point scale.; Sources: "2023 Player Commits". ESPN. Archived from the original on August 1, 2022.; "2023 Team Ranking". Rivals.

== Preseason ==
=== Preseason rankings ===
Pac-12 media poll (Coaches)
Predicted finish	Team	Votes (1st place)
1	Stanford	121 (11)
2	Oregon	101
3	Arizona	100
4	UCLA	91
5	Utah	84 (1)
6	Oregon State	62
7	Washington State	61
8	Colorado	55
9	USC	50
10	Washington	28
11	California	21
12	Arizona State	18

=== Preseason All-conference teams ===
Award	Player	Position	Year
Preseason All Pac-12 team	Cate Reese	F	GS
Preseason All Pac-12 team	Jade Loville	F/G	GS
Preseason All Pac-12 team	Shaina Pellington	F	GS

=== Award watch lists ===
Listed in the order that they were released

Award	Player	Position	Year	Source
Ann Meyers Drysdale Award	Jade Loville	SG	GS	
Katrina McClain Award	Cate Reese	PF	GS	
Katrina McClain Award	Esmery Martínez	PF	Sr.	
Naismith Trophy	Jade Loville	SG	GS	
Naismith Trophy	Cate Reese	PF	GS	
Wooden Award	Cate Reese	PF	GS	

== Roster ==
2022–23 Arizona Wildcats women's basketball team
Players
Coaches

Pos.	#	Name	Height	Year	Previous school	Hometown
G	1	Shaina Pellington	5 ft 8 in (1.73 m)	GS	Dunabarton	Pickering, ON
G	4	Madison Conner	5 ft 11 in (1.8 m)	So	AZ Compass Prep	Chandler, AZ
G	10	Lemyah Hylton	5 ft 11 in (1.8 m)	Fr	Southwest Academy Girls Prep	London, ON
F	12	Esmery Martínez	6 ft 2 in (1.88 m)	Sr	Hamilton Heights Christian Academy	Hato Mayor del Rey, DR
G	13	Helena Pueyo	6 ft 3 in (1.91 m)	Sr	Palma de Mallorca, Spain
G	15	Kailyn Gilbert	5 ft 8 in (1.73 m)	Fr	Seffner Christian Academy	Tampa, FL
G	22	Paris Clark	5 ft 8 in (1.73 m)	Fr	Long Island Lutheran	Mount Vernon, NY
G	23	Lauren Fields	5 ft 9 in (1.75 m)	Sr	Shawnee	Shawnee, OK
F	25	Cate Reese	6 ft 2 in (1.88 m)	GS	Cypress	Cypress, TX
G/F	30	Jade Loville	5 ft 11 in (1.8 m)	GS	Skyline	Scottsdale, AZ
F	32	Lauren Ware (injured)	6 ft 5 in (1.96 m)	Jr	Century	Bismarck, ND
F	34	Maya Nnaji	6 ft 4 in (1.93 m)	Fr	Hopkins	St. Louis Park, MN

Head coach

- Adia Barnes (Arizona)

Assistant coach(es)

- Ashley Davis (TCU)
- Salvo Coppa (IULM)
- Erin Grant (Texas Tech)

Legend

- (C) Team captain
- (S) Suspended
- (I) Ineligible
- (W) Walk-on
- Injured
- Current redshirt

Roster
Last update: May 1, 2022

- Notes
  - Junior Lauren Ware to miss 22–23 season with a knee injury.

== Schedule ==
Date time, TV	Rank^{#}	Opponent^{#}	Result	Record	High points	High rebounds	High assists	Site (attendance) city, state
Exhibition
October 27, 2022*; 6:00 p.m.	No. 19	West Texas A&M	W 86–63	—	20 – Loville	12 – Martinez	6 – Pellington	McKale Center (2,763); Tucson, AZ
November 2, 2022*; 6:00 p.m.	No. 19	Cal State Los Angeles	W 104–46		26 – Lovelle	12 – Martinez	7 – Pueyo	McKale Center (6,430); Tucson, AZ
Non-conference regular season
November 10, 2022*; 6:30 pm	No. 19	Northern Arizona	W 113–56	1–0	20 – Martinez	15 – Martinez	7 – Pellington	McKale Center (6,809); Tucson, AZ
November 13, 2022*; 5:00 pm	No. 19	Cal State Northridge	W 87–47	2–0	16 – Gilbert	5 – Martinez	3 – Pueyo	McKale Center (6,653); Tucson, AZ
November 18, 2022*; 6:30 pm	No. 18	Loyola Marymount	W 87–51	3–0	19 – Pellington	11 – Martinez	4 – Tied	McKale Center (7,206); Tucson, AZ
November 20, 2022*; 2:00 pm	No. 18	Long Beach State	W 86–64	4–0	19 – Martinez	9 – Tied	4 – Tied	McKale Center (6,898); Tucson, AZ
November 25, 2022*; 5:00 pm	No. 15	vs. Cal Baptist; USD Thanksgiving Classic	W 81–63	5–0	25 – Gilbert	10 – Martinez	3 – Tied	Jenny Craig Pavilion (149); San Diego, CA
November 26, 2022*; 5:00 pm	No. 15	at San Diego; USD Thanksgiving Classic	W 86–60	6–0	22 – Pueyo	9 – Martinez	4 – Pueyo	Jenny Craig Pavilion; San Diego, CA
December 4, 2022*; 1:00 p.m.	No. 14	at New Mexico	W 77–60	7–0	27 – Loville	8 – Martinez	9 – Pueyo	The Pit (6,087); Albuquerque, NM
December 8, 2022*; 6:30 p.m., P12N	No. 12	Kansas	L 50–77	7–1	14 – Reese	8 – Reese	2 – Tied	McKale Center (7,381); Tucson, AZ
December 14, 2022*; 6:30 p.m., P12N	No. 20	Texas Southern; Pac-12/SWAC Legacy Series	W 89–55	8–1	20 – Reese	12 – Martinez	4 – Pueyo	McKale Center (6,577); Tucson, AZ
December 18, 2022*; 5:30 p.m., ESPN2	No. 20	vs. No. 18 Baylor; Pac-12 Coast-to-Coast Challenge	W 75–54	9–1	18 – Pellington	15 – Martinez	8 – Pellington	American Airlines Center; Dallas, TX
December 21, 2022*; 2:00 pm, ESPN+	No. 18	at UT Arlington	W 78–59	10–1	13 – Martinez	9 – Tied	4 – Gilbert	College Park Center (1,109); Arlington, TX
Pac-12 regular season
December 29, 2022; 6:00 p.m., P12N	No. 18	Arizona State	W 84–66	11–1 (1–0)	21 – Martinez	10 – Martinez	4 – Tied	McKale Center (9,495); Tucson, AZ
December 31, 2022; 8:00 p.m., P12N	No. 18	at California	W 63–56	12–1 (2-0)	14 – Reese	7 – Reese	4 – Pellington	Haas Pavilion (605); Berkeley, CA
January 2, 2023; 12:30 p.m., P12N	No. 15	at No. 2 Stanford	L 57–73	12–2 (2–1)	12 – Loville	7 – Pueyo	3 – Pellington	Maples Pavilion (3,824); Stanford, CA
January 6, 2023; 8:00 p.m., P12N	No. 15	Oregon State	W 72–69	13–2 (3–1)	16 – Reese	8 – Martinez	6 – Tied	McKale Center (7,182); Tucson, AZ
January 8, 2023; 5:00 p.m., ESPN2	No. 15	No. 18 Oregon	W 79–71	14–2 (4–1)	16 – Conner	6 – Tied	6 – Pellington	McKale Center (7,963); Tucson, AZ
January 13, 2023; 7:00 p.m., P12N	No. 14	at Colorado	L 65–72	14–3 (4–2)	14 – Reese	9 – Reese	3 – Tied	CU Events Center (1,974); Boulder, CO
January 15, 2023; 12:00 p.m., P12N	No. 14	at No. 10 Utah	L 79–80	14–4 (4–3)	25 – Reese	10 – Reese	4 – Fields	Jon M. Huntsman Center (2,915); Salt Lake City, UT
January 22, 2023; 3:00 p.m., P12N	No. 19	at Arizona State	W 80–67	15–4 (5–3)	16 – Conner	15 – Martinez	4 – Pueyo	Desert Financial Arena (3,508); Tempe, AZ
January 27, 2023; 7:00 p.m., P12N	No. 19	Washington	W 61–54	16–4 (6–3)	15 – Reese	12 – Martinez	5 – Pellington	McKale Center (7,884); Tucson, AZ
January 29, 2023; 12:00 p.m., P12N	No. 19	Washington State	L 59–70	16–5 (6–4)	14 – Martinez	7 – Reese	4 – Pueyo	McKale Center (7,494); Tucson, AZ
February 3, 2023; 9:00 p.m., P12N	No. 22	at No. 14 UCLA	W 71–66 ^{OT}	17–5 (7–4)	21 – Pellington	13 – Martinez	3 – Tied	Pauley Pavilion (3,482); Los Angeles, CA
February 5, 2023; 1:00 p.m., P12N	No. 22	at USC	W 81–75 ^{2OT}	18–5 (8–4)	33 – Reese	8 – Tied	7 – Pellington	Galen Center (1,356); Los Angeles, CA
February 9, 2023; 7:30 p.m., ESPN	No. 17	No. 6 Stanford	L 60–84	18–6 (8–5)	10 – Tied	6 – Martinez	4 – Clark	McKale Center (9,868); Tucson, AZ
February 12, 2023; 12:00 p.m., P12N	No. 17	California	W 80–57	19–6 (9–5)	24 – Pellington	15 – Martinez	7 – Martinez	McKale Center (7,268); Tucson, AZ
February 17, 2023; 7:00 p.m., P12N	No. 18	No. 4 Utah	W 82–72	20–6 (10–5)	35 – Pellington	8 – Pellington	2 – Tied	McKale Center (8,238); Tucson, AZ
February 19, 2023; 12:00 p.m., P12N	No. 18	No. 21 Colorado	W 61–42	21–6 (11–5)	19 – Pellington	7 – Martinez	5 – Pellington	McKale Center (8,267); Tucson, AZ
February 23, 2023; 8:00 p.m., P12N	No. 14	at Oregon	L 59–73	21–7 (11–6)	19 – Reese	10 – Clark	2 – Tied	Matthew Knight Arena (6,173); Eugene, OR
February 25, 2023; 1:00 p.m., P12N	No. 14	at Oregon State	L 70–78	21–8 (11–7)	16 – Martinez	8 – Martinez	7 – Pellington	Gill Coliseum (4,357); Corvallis, OR
Pac-12 Women's Tournament
March 2, 2023; 1:00 p.m., P12N	(4) No. 21	vs. (5) No. 19 UCLA; Quarterfinals	L 59–73	21–9	10 – Tied	9 – Reese	3 – Tied	Michelob Ultra Arena (4,245); Paradise, NV
NCAA Women's Tournament
March 17, 2023; 9:00 a.m., ESPN	(7 G1) No. 25	vs. (10 G1) West Virginia; First round	W 75–62	22–9	25 – Reese	12 – Martinez	4 – Pellington	Xfinity Center; College Park, MD
March 19, 2023*; 2:30 p.m., ESPN	(7 G1) No. 25	at (2 G1) No. 7 Maryland; Second round	L 64–77	22–10	19 – Reese	13 – Martinez	3 – Martinez	Xfinity Center (6,622); College Park, MD
*Non-conference game. ^{#}Rankings from AP Poll. (#) Tournament seedings in parentheses. G1=Greenville 1. All times are in Mountain Time.

== Awards and honors ==
Weekly honors
Recipient (Position)	Award (Pac-12 Conference)	Stats (PPG/RPG/APG)	Week	Date Awarded	Ref.
Kaitlyn Gilbert (G)	Freshman Player of the Week	17.5 PPG, 4.5 RPG, 2.0 APG, 1.5 SPG	Week 4	November 28, 2022	

=== Postseason ===
Conference honors
Recipient (Position)	Award (Pac-12 Conference)	Stats (PPG/RPG/APG)	Ref.
Shaina Pellington (G)	Co-Most Improved Player Of The Year	13.4 PPG/3.1 RPG/3.7 APG/1.9 SPG	
Shaina Pellington (G)	All Pac-12 First Team	13.4 PPG/3.1 RPG/3.7 APG/1.9 SPG	
Shaina Pellington (G)	All Pac-12 Defensive Team	13.4 PPG/3.1 RPG/3.7 APG/1.9 SPG	
Cate Reese (F)	All Pac-12 First Team	23.8 PPG/5.8 RPG/1.0 APG	
Helena Pueyo (G)	All Pac-12 Defensive Team	5.6 PPG/3.0 RPG/2.3 SPG	

== Rankings ==
Ranking movements Legend: ██ Increase in ranking ██ Decrease in ranking RV = Received votes
	Week																			
Poll	Pre	1	2	3	4	5	6	7	8	9	10	11	12	13	14	15	16	17	18	Final
AP	19	18	15	14	12	20	18	18	15	14	19	19	22	17	18	14	21	24	25	Not released
Coaches	19	18	14	13	12	17	16	15	13	10	15	14	20	15	18	14	20	22	23	RV

== Media coverage ==
=== Radio ===
- ESPN Tucson – 1490 AM & 104.09 FM (ESPN Radio) and Nationwide – Dish Network, SiriusXM, Varsity Network and iHeartRadio)
- KCUB 1290 AM – Football Radio Show – (Tucson, AZ)
- KHYT – 107.5 FM (Tucson, AZ)
- KTKT 990 AM – La Hora de Los Gatos (Spanish) – (Tucson, AZ)
- KGME 910 AM – (IMG Sports Network) – (Phoenix, AZ)
- KTAN 1420 AM – (Sierra Vista, AZ)
- KDAP 96.5 FM (Douglas, Arizona)
- KWRQ 102.3 FM – (Safford, AZ/Thatcher, AZ)
- KIKO 1340 AM – (Globe, AZ)
- KVWM 970 AM – (Show Low, AZ/Pinetop-Lakeside, AZ)
- XENY 760 – (Nogales, Sonora) (Spanish)
- KTZR (1450 AM) – (FoxSports 1450) – (Tucson, AZ)

=== TV ===
- CBS Family – KOLD (CBS), CBSN
- ABC/ESPN Family – KGUN (ABC), ABC, ESPN, ESPN2, ESPNU, ESPN+,
- FOX Family – KMSB (FOX), FOX/FS1, FSN
- Pac-12 Network (Pac-12 Arizona)
- NBC Family – KVOA, NBC Sports, NBCSN
- PBS – KUAT
- Univision – KUVE (Spanish)
- Telemundo – KHRR (Spanish)
