= Aari McDonald =

American basketball player (born 1998)

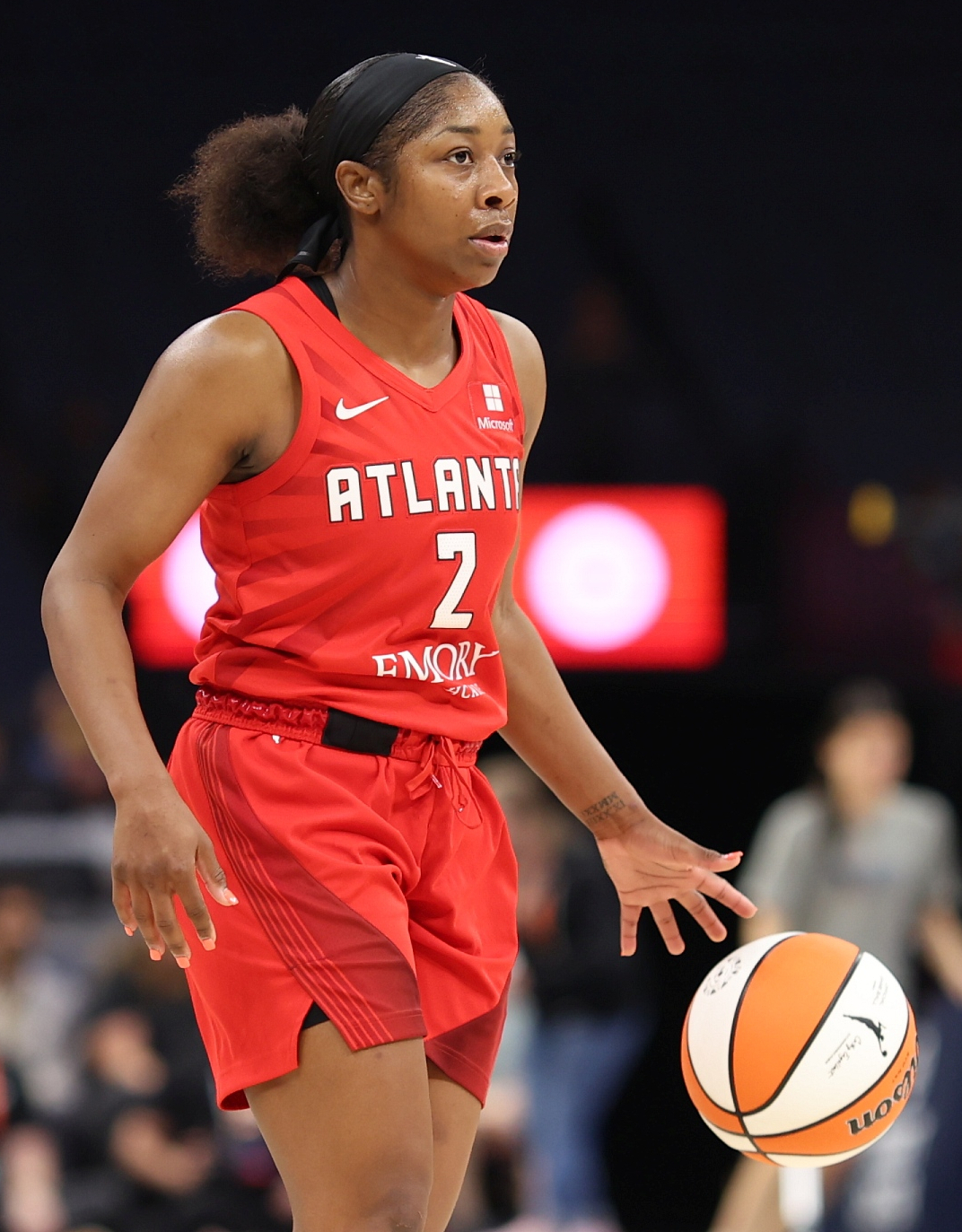
- McDonald with the Atlanta Dream in 2023

No. 4 – Minnesota Lynx
- Position: Shooting guard / point guard
- League: WNBA

Personal information
- Born: August 20, 1998 (age 28) Fresno, California, U.S.
- Listed height: 5 ft 6 in (1.68 m)
- Listed weight: 141 lb (64 kg)

Career information
- High school: Brookside Christian (Stockton, California)
- College: Washington (2016–2017); Arizona (2018–2021)
- WNBA draft: 2021: 1st round, 3rd overall pick
- Drafted by: Atlanta Dream
- Playing career: 2021–present

Career history
- 2021–2023: Atlanta Dream
- 2021: Uni Gyor MELY-UT
- 2023–2024: Perth Lynx
- 2024: Los Angeles Sparks
- 2024–2025: Beijing Great Wall
- 2025: Indiana Fever
- 2026–present: Breeze BC
- 2026–present: Minnesota Lynx

Career highlights
- WNBA Commissioner's Cup Champion (2025); All-WNBL Second Team (2024); WNBL scoring champion (2024); WNBA All-Rookie Team (2021); 2× First-team WBCA All-American (2020, 2021); 2× Second-team All-American – AP, USBWA (2020, 2021); Ann Meyers Drysdale Award (2020); Pac-12 Player of the Year (2021); 2× Pac-12 Defensive Player of the Year (2020, 2021); 3× All-Pac-12 (2019–2021); 3× Pac-12 All-Defensive team (2019–2021); Pac-12 All-Freshman Team (2017)
- Stats at Basketball Reference

Aarion Shawnae McDonald (AIR-ee-on; born August 20, 1998) is an American professional basketball player for the Minnesota Lynx of the Women's National Basketball Association (WNBA) and for the Breeze of Unrivaled. She was selected third overall by the Atlanta Dream in the 2021 WNBA draft after playing college basketball for the Washington Huskies and the Arizona Wildcats.

== Early life ==
McDonald grew up in Fresno, California as the youngest of six children. After initially playing at Bullard High School in her freshman year, she transferred to Brookside Christian High School in Stockton, California. At Brookside, she compiled nearly 1,500 points scored in her two years with the school, recording multiple triple-doubles and even a quadruple double. A four-star recruit, she committed to playing college basketball at Washington.

== College career ==
=== University of Washington ===
After missing the first seven games due to injury, McDonald played in 28 games, starting 21 of them. She was named to the Pac-12 All-Freshman team after averaging 9.8 points on the season, third on the team behind Kelsey Plum and Chantel Osahor.

McDonald announced that she would leave the program and transfer after one season. She cited departures of Plum, Osahor, head coach Mike Neighbors, assistant coach Morgan Valley, and the passing of her grandfather as reasons for her transfer.

=== University of Arizona ===
McDonald decided to transfer to play at Arizona for Adia Barnes, a former Washington assistant who was heavily involved in recruiting her to play for the Huskies. She spent her first season with the program sitting out due to transfer rules and was a member of the scout team.

==== Redshirt sophomore year ====
McDonald made an immediate impact in her first year on the court for the Wildcats, tying the school's single game scoring record with 39 points against Loyola Marymount in the second game of the season. She finished the season with 890 points scored, breaking a single-season record set by her coach Barnes, and was the second player in Pac-12 history to have 800 points and 150 assists, joining her former teammate Plum. She was named to the All-Pac-12 first team and defensive team at the end of the season.

==== Redshirt junior year ====
After tying the single-game record for scoring in the previous season, McDonald broke the record with a 44-point performance against 22nd-ranked Texas on November 17, 2019.

McDonald racked up awards, being named a second-team All-American by the Associated Press and United States Basketball Writers Association, a first-team All-American by the Women's Basketball Coaches Association, Pac-12 Defensive Player of the Year, first-team All-Pac-12 and on the Pac-12 All-Defensive team. She was also a finalist for the Naismith Defensive Player of the Year Award and named the 2020 recipient of the Ann Meyers Drysdale Award, given to the top shooting guard in the country.

Although she was eligible for the WNBA draft, McDonald announced that she would return for her senior season at Arizona.

==== Redshirt senior year ====
McDonald was named the Pac-12 Conference Player of the Year, becoming the first Arizona player to win the award since her head coach Adia Barnes. She was also named the Co-Defensive Player of the Year, the second consecutive year she was named the winner.

McDonald excelled during Arizona's 2021 NCAA tournament run. After leading the Wildcats past Stony Brook and BYU, she scored 31 points against Texas A&M in the Sweet Sixteen, sending Arizona to the Elite Eight for the first time. She scored 33 points in the Wildcats' Elite Eight match against Indiana, despite suffering an ankle injury with more than two minutes remaining in the game. In their next game against UConn, she scored 26 points en route to earning the first championship appearance in program history, as well as praise from UConn head coach Geno Auriemma.

In the national championship game, McDonald scored a game-high 22 points and was able to get the final shot of the game off, but could not get it to fall as the Wildcats lost to Stanford 54–53, ending their historic run. She ended her college career after scoring double-digits in 93 consecutive games, which was the longest active streak.

== Professional career ==
=== WNBA ===
==== Atlanta Dream (2021–2023) ====
After being projected to be a top-five draft pick, McDonald was drafted third overall by the Atlanta Dream in the 2021 WNBA draft. She averaged 6.3 points, 1.6 rebounds and 2.0 assists in 30 games in the 2021 WNBA season. She was subsequently named to the WNBA All-Rookie Team.

McDonald returned to the Atlanta Dream for the 2022 WNBA season and averaged 11.1 points, 2.3 rebounds, 2.6 assists and 1.4 steals in 36 games. She returned to the Dream in 2023 for a third season.

==== Los Angeles Sparks (2024) ====
On February 1, 2024, McDonald was traded to the Los Angeles Sparks alongside the 8th pick in the 2024 WNBA draft in exchange for Jordin Canada and the 12th pick.

On April 15, 2025, McDonald re-signed with the Sparks. However, she did not play the season with the team, as she did not make the final roster.

==== Indiana Fever (2025) ====
On June 2, 2025, McDonald signed with the Indiana Fever via emergency hardship exception due to injuries to Caitlin Clark and Sophie Cunningham. She was released by the Fever on June 13 upon their return. The Fever re-signed McDonald on June 25. During the fourth quarter of the Fever's August 7 game at Phoenix, McDonald exited the fourth with a right foot injury. The following day, the Fever announced McDonald had sustained a season-ending injury, a fracture in her right foot.

==== Minnesota Lynx (2026) ====
On September 7, 2026, McDonald signed with the Minnesota Lynx.

=== Unrivaled ===
On November 5, 2025, it was announced that McDonald had been drafted by Breeze BC for the 2026 Unrivaled season.

=== Overseas ===
In October 2021, McDonald had a four-game stint in Hungary with Uni Gyor MELY-UT.

On August 25, 2023, McDonald signed with the Perth Lynx in Australia for the 2023–24 WNBL season. On December 29, 2023, she was ruled out for six weeks with a knee injury. She suffered a torn medial collateral ligament two days earlier against the UC Capitals but avoided a knee reconstruction. She returned to the line-up for the final two regular-season games, scoring 24 and 26 points to help the Lynx clinch a playoff spot. She finished as the league's scoring champion with 19.8 points per game and earned All-WNBL Second Team honors. She scored 26 and 27 points in two semi-final games to lift the fourth-placed Lynx over the first-placed Townsville Fire to reach the WNBL grand final series. In game one of the grand final series against the Southside Flyers, McDonald had 15 points and 10 assists in a 101–79 win. They went on to lose game two 97–95 despite McDonald's game-high 26 points. McDonald had 21 points in a 115–81 loss in game three.

McDonald signed with the Beijing Great Wall of the Women's Chinese Basketball Association for the 2024–2025 season.

== Career statistics ==
Legend
GP	Games played	GS	Games started	MPG	Minutes per game	RPG	Rebounds per game
APG	Assists per game	SPG	Steals per game	BPG	Blocks per game	PPG	Points per game
TO	Turnovers per game	FG%	Field-goal percentage	3P%	3-point field-goal percentage	FT%	Free-throw percentage
**Bold**	Career best	°	League leader

=== WNBA ===
==== Regular season ====
Stats current through end of 2025 season

WNBA regular season statistics
Year	Team	GP	GS	MPG	FG%	3P%	FT%	RPG	APG	SPG	BPG	TO	PPG
2021	Atlanta	30	4	16.4	.322	.308	**.882**	1.6	2.0	0.8	**0.2**	**1.2**	6.3
2022	Atlanta	**36**	6	24.3	.411	**.338**	.871	2.3	2.6	**1.4**	0.0	2.1	**11.1**
2023	Atlanta	24	9	23.5	.402	.321	.762	2.0	3.0	0.6	0.0	1.6	7.9
2024	Los Angeles	26	10	21.8	.403	.319	.843	2.0	3.7	0.9	0.2	1.8	8.7
2025	Indiana	20	**13**	**26.3**	**.429**	.308	.784	**2.4**	**4.7**	1.3	**0.2**	2.3	9.8
**Career**	5 years, 3 teams	136	42	22.3	.395	.320	.838	2.0	3.1	1.0	0.1	1.8	8.8

==== Playoffs ====
WNBA playoff statistics
Year	Team	GP	GS	MPG	FG%	3P%	FT%	RPG	APG	SPG	BPG	TO	PPG
2023	Atlanta	2	0	18.0	.273	.250	0.0	1.0	2.5	1.0	0.0	2.5	3.5
2025	Indiana	Did not play (injury)											
**Career**	1 year, 1 team	2	0	18.0	.273	.250	0.0	1.0	2.5	1.0	0.0	2.5	3.5

=== College ===
NCAA statistics
Year	Team	GP	GS	MPG	FG%	3P%	FT%	RPG	APG	SPG	BPG	TO	PPG
2016–17	Washington	28	21	24.1	**.473**	.330	.667	2.7	1.4	1.4	**0.1**	1.6	9.8
2017–18	Arizona	Did not play (NCAA transfer rules)											
2018–19	Arizona	**37**	**37**	**35.7**	.452	.281	.755	**6.5**	**4.6**	**2.6**	**0.1**	**3.8**	**24.1**
2019–20	Arizona	29	29	31.8	.458	.278	**.788**	5.6	3.6	2.3	0.0	**3.8**	20.6
2020–21	Arizona	27	27	33.6	.407	**.345**	.765	5.4	4.0	**2.6**	**0.1**	3.1	20.6
**Career**	5 years, 2 teams	121	114	31.6	.444	.305	.756	5.1	3.4	2.3	0.1	3.1	19.1

== Personal life ==
McDonald is the daughter of Aaron and Andrea McDonald. Her brother Tre'von Willis played basketball at UNLV.

McDonald is currently married to former Arizona defensive back Devon Brewer, who proposed to her after the Wildcats were eliminated from the Pac-12 Tournament in 2020. The pair was married on September 23, 2021, during her first season in the WNBA.
