= Sam Thomas (basketball) =

American basketball player (born 1999)

Personal information
- Born: June 14, 1999 (age 27) Las Vegas, Nevada, U.S.
- Listed height: 6 ft 0 in (1.83 m)

Career information
- High school: Centennial (Las Vegas, Nevada)
- College: Arizona (2017–2022)
- WNBA draft: 2022: undrafted
- Playing career: 2022–present
- Position: Guard/forward
- Number: 14

Career history
- 2022-2023: Phoenix Mercury

Career highlights
- Elite 90 Award (2021); 2× All-Pac-12 (2021, 2022); 3× Pac-12 All Defensive Team (2020–2022); Pac-12 All-Freshman Team (2018)
- Stats at Basketball Reference

Sam Thomas (born June 14, 1999) is an American professional basketball player. She was undrafted in the 2022 WNBA draft, but made the Phoenix Mercury roster in 2022. She played college basketball at Arizona.

== College career ==
Thomas committed to Arizona career after being ranked 92nd overall by ESPN HoopGurlz for the 2017 Class. She was the highest rated Wildcat recruit coming in from the class. During her freshman season, Thomas started all 30 games for the Wildcats and scored the 10th most points in Arizona history by a freshman with 306. Thomas earned the Pac-12 All-Freshman team for her year.

Her sophomore season, Thomas began to standout more for her defensive efforts. She led the Wildcat team in blocks and was second in steals. She again started every single game, scored 9.1 points, and was very consistent with the ball - only having 29 turnovers for the entire year. During her junior season, Thomas earned Honorable Mention All-Pac-12 and was named to the Pac-12 All-Defensive Team. Thomas scored a career-high 31 points, including going 13-for-13 from the free line on February 21, 2020, against Utah.

During her senior season, Thomas helped the Wildcats earn a trip to the Women's Final Four. While at the Final Four, Thomas was awarded the Elite 90 Award - the player with the best GPA of any student-athlete at the Final Four. She led the team in blocks and was second on the team in steals. Thomas came back for her extra-COVID year and helped guide the Wildcats back to the NCAA Tournament. She became the first player in program history to repeat as a CoSIDA Academic All-American. She made the Pac-12 All-Defensive again for the third straight year and was a Pac-12 Honorable Mention selection.

== College statistics ==
Year	Team	GP	Points	FG%	3P%	FT%	RPG	APG	SPG	BPG	PPG
2017–18	Arizona	30	306	.418	.369	.774	7.0	1.4	1.5	1.3	10.2
2018–19	Arizona	37	337	.405	.327	.765	3.1	1.4	1.6	1.4	9.1
2019–20	Arizona	31	296	.432	.378	.795	3.4	2.2	1.7	1.5	9.5
2020–21	Arizona	27	196	.405	.386	.833	3.4	1.5	2.3	1.2	7.3
2021–22	Arizona	29	247	.434	.417	.761	3.0	2.1	1.5	1.0	8.5
Career		154	1382	.418	.372	.782	4.1	1.7	1.7	1.3	9.0

== Professional career ==
=== Phoenix Mercury ===
Thomas went undrafted in the 2022 WNBA draft, but signed a training camp contract with the Phoenix Mercury. Sam made the Opening Night roster for the 2022 season with the Mercury.

Thomas went through training camp with the Mercury for the 2023 season, but was ultimately waived at the end of camp and did not make the Opening Night roster. Thomas returned to the Mercury on June 21, 2023, when she signed a Hardship Contract with them. Thomas was released from the Hardship Contract a few days later.

== WNBA career statistics ==
Legend
GP	Games played	GS	Games started	MPG	Minutes per game	RPG	Rebounds per game
APG	Assists per game	SPG	Steals per game	BPG	Blocks per game	PPG	Points per game
TO	Turnovers per game	FG%	Field-goal percentage	3P%	3-point field-goal percentage	FT%	Free-throw percentage
**Bold**	Career best	°	League leader

=== Regular season ===
Year	Team	GP	GS	MPG	FG%	3P%	FT%	RPG	APG	SPG	BPG	TO	PPG
2022	Phoenix	**24**	0	4.9	**.211**	**.067**	**1.000**	0.2	**0.3**	**0.3**	**0.1**	0.2	**0.4**
2023	Phoenix	1	0	**11.0**	.000	—	—	**1.0**	0.0	0.0	0.0	**0.0**	0.0
Career	2 years, 1 team	25	0	5.2	.190	.067	1.000	0.2	0.2	0.2	0.1	0.2	0.4

=== Playoffs ===
Year	Team	GP	GS	MPG	FG%	3P%	FT%	RPG	APG	SPG	BPG	TO	PPG
2022	Phoenix	2	0	7.0	.500	.500	.000	0.0	0.0	0.5	0.0	0.0	1.5
Career	1 year, 1 team	2	0	7.0	.500	.500	.000	0.0	0.0	0.5	0.0	0.0	1.5
