= Adia Barnes =

American basketball coach and player (born 1977)

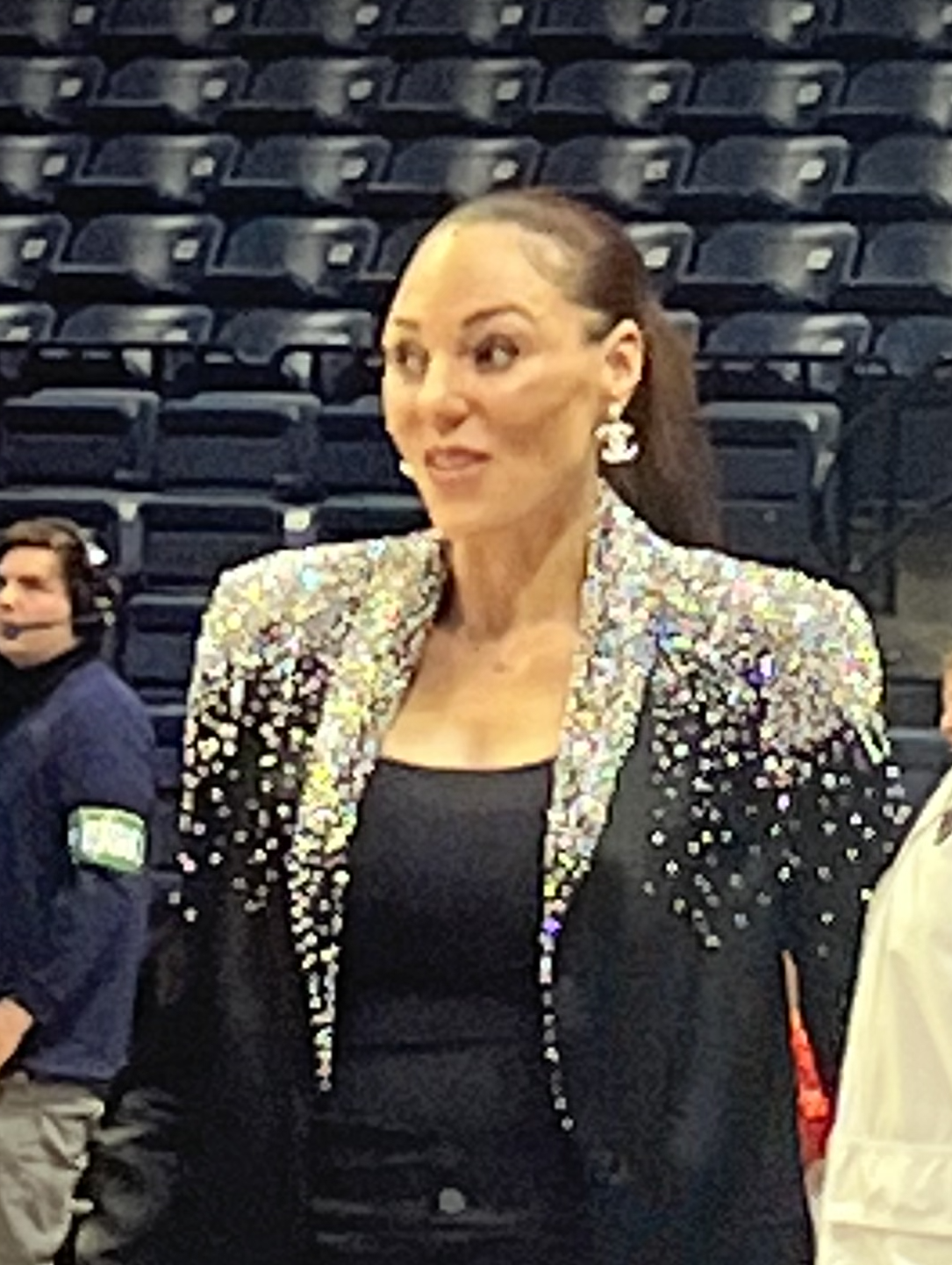
- Barnes in 2024

SMU Mustangs
- Title: Head coach
- League: Atlantic Coast Conference

Personal information
- Born: February 3, 1977 (age 49) San Diego, California, U.S.
- Listed height: 5 ft 11 in (1.80 m)
- Listed weight: 165 lb (75 kg)

Career information
- High school: Mission Bay (San Diego, California)
- College: Arizona (1994–1998)
- WNBA draft: 1998: 4th round, 32nd overall pick
- Drafted by: Sacramento Monarchs
- Playing career: 1998–2010
- Position: Forward
- Number: 32
- Coaching career: 2011–present

Career history

Playing
- 1998: Sacramento Monarchs
- 1999: Minnesota Lynx
- 2000–2001: Cleveland Rockers
- 2002–2004: Seattle Storm
- 2004–2006: Mersin BB
- 2006–2007: UMMC Ekaterinburg
- 2007–2008: Napoli Basket Vomero
- 2008–2009: Libertas Trogylos
- 2009–2010: Pallacanestro Pozzuoli

Coaching
- 2011–2016: Washington (assistant)
- 2016–2025: Arizona
- 2025–present: SMU

Career highlights
- As player: WNBA champion (2004); Third-team All-American – AP (1998); All-American – USBWA (1998); Pac-10 Player of the Year (1998); 3× All Pac-10 (1996–1998); As coach: WNIT champion (2019); NCAA Regional – Final Four (2021)
- Stats at Basketball Reference

Adia Oshun Barnes (born February 3, 1977) is an American basketball coach and former player. As of 2025–26 she is the head coach of the SMU Mustangs. She played at the collegiate level for the University of Arizona, and played seven seasons in the Women's National Basketball Association (WNBA) with the Houston Comets, Seattle Storm, Minnesota Lynx, and Sacramento Monarchs. She has played internationally with Dynamo Kyiv in Ukraine. Barnes has also served as a TV color analyst for Seattle Storm game broadcasts.

== Early years ==
Barnes grew up in San Diego, California, and attended Mission Bay Senior High School in San Diego. She is the daughter of NFL player Pete Barnes. He and Adia's mother Pat divorced when she was three. Over the course of her high school career, she amassed 1112 blocks, the most ever recorded by a female high school basketball player, 253 blocks ahead of second place Chris Enger.

== College ==
At 5 ft 11 in, Barnes was not as tall as most post position players at the highly regarded Division I schools. The University of Arizona head coach Joan Bonvicini initially didn't think she would be able to play at the post, even after watching film of her play. However, after seeing her in person, she immediately offered Barnes a scholarship, who enrolled in the school for the 1995 season. Her physical play earned her a comparison to Charles Barkley from a Sports Illustrated writer. In her freshman year she earned the Pac-10 freshman of the year award, the first player from Arizona to win such an award.

In Barnes's sophomore year, the team earned a WNIT bid and won the championship. Barnes was named the tournament Most Valuable Player. As a junior, Barnes helped the team to their first ever NCAA appearance. They won their first game against Western Kentucky, and then lost by six points to the second seed in their bracket, Georgia. She went on to set 22 individual records for the Arizona Wildcats, including career points and rebounds, many of which are still records. She would go on to become the first women's player in Arizona to be drafted into the professional leagues.

== WNBA career ==
Although successful as an undersized post in college, Barnes knew that she would not be able to continue as a post player in the pros, so she decided to transform herself into a guard. She originally was signed by the Sacramento Monarchs, playing in 29 games and earning a starting position in 16 games.

During the 1999 expansion draft on April 6, 1999, Barnes was selected by the Minnesota Lynx.

In 2000 she traded to Cleveland, and saw her playing time dwindle. She played overseas to work on her skills and concentrated on becoming a specialist.

In 2002, she was traded to the Seattle Storm, who were picked to finish second to last in their division. With Sue Bird and Lauren Jackson on the team, Storm coach Lin Dunn wasn't looking for a scorer, so Barnes concentrated on becoming a shut-down defender. Her work effort paid off, and she helped the team to make the playoffs in only their third year of existence.

== International ==
Barnes also played internationally with Dynamo Kyiv in Ukraine. She played for several Euroleague teams, Priolo (Italy), Elitzur Ramla (Israel), Napoli BK (Italy), UMMC (Russia), Mersin (Turkey), and Pozzuoli (Italy).

== Broadcasting ==
In 2007, Barnes became a color commentator for the radio coverage of the Storm. She had some experience as a commentator for the World Championship games. The games were held in Brazil, but the broadcasts were done in a remote studio, making it a challenge. As of 2012, she did broadcasts of Storm games for both radio and TV, along with play-by-play announcer Dick Fain. Barnes was also the color commentator for the radio broadcasts of Seattle University Redhawks women's basketball games during the 2010–2011 season.

== Coaching ==
In October 2010, Barnes was named Director of Player and Coach Development at Seattle Academy.

=== Arizona ===
Barnes was approached by her Arizona coach Joan Bonvicini to see if she was interested in coaching. At the time, Barnes was still actively playing for the Storm, and turned down the opportunity. However, she enjoyed working at camps, so when the new head coach of the University of Washington, Kevin McGuff, asked her in 2011 to consider coaching, he was able to persuade her, and she joined the Huskies as an assistant coach. Barnes was named head women's basketball coach at the University of Arizona on April 4, 2016.

After a fairly rough start to her coaching career, Barnes entered her third season with the Wildcats, with high hopes. The team began the year 12–1, but ultimately struggled when it came to Pac-12 conference play. After finishing the regular season with 17 wins, their most in the regular season since 2010–11, Arizona entered the conference tournament as the No. 8 seed, knocking off USC to begin tournament play. The Wildcats would finish the year 18–13, before ultimately being selected for the Women's National Invitation Tournament.

The Wildcats guided by Barnes, would make it to the WNIT Final, knocking off Northwestern to become the 2019 WNIT Champions.

The Wildcats beat Indiana in 2021 to reach the school's first ever Final Four.

On April 2, 2021, the Wildcats beat the University of Connecticut Huskies to reach the school's first NCAA tournament championship game.

=== SMU ===
As of the 2025–26 season, Barnes is head coach of the SMU Mustangs women's basketball team.

== Career statistics ==
=== College ===
Year	GP	GS	Min.	Avg.	FG	FGA	Pct.	3FG	3FGA	Pct.	FT	FTA	Pct.	OR	DR	Tot.	Avg.	PF-DQ	A	TO	B	ST	Pts.	Avg.
1994-95	30	24	814	27.1	191	411	0.465	1	3	0.333	81	131	0.618	103	130	233	7.8	99-5	18	89	1	40	464	15.5
1995-96	30	26	849	28.3	209	396	0.528	0	3	0	104	154	0.675	73	148	221	7.4	113-8	38	96	8	54	522	17.4
1996-97	31	31	883	28.5	232	452	0.513	1	5	0.2	133	182	0.731	112	143	255	8.2	98-4	51	101	13	86	598	19.3
1997-98	30	29	907	30.2	249	472	0.528	1	4	0.25	154	204	0.755	95	117	212	7.1	103-4	40	88	5	76	653	21.8
Career	121	110	3453	28.5	881	1731	0.509	3	15	0.2	472	671	0.703	383	538	921	7.6	413-21	147	374	27	256	2237	18.5

=== WNBA ===
Legend
GP	Games played	GS	Games started	MPG	Minutes per game	RPG	Rebounds per game
APG	Assists per game	SPG	Steals per game	BPG	Blocks per game	PPG	Points per game
TO	Turnovers per game	FG%	Field-goal percentage	3P%	3-point field-goal percentage	FT%	Free-throw percentage
**Bold**	Career best	°	League leader

†	Denotes seasons in which Barnes won a WNBA championship

==== Regular season ====
Year	Team	GP	GS	MPG	FG%	3P%	FT%	RPG	APG	SPG	BPG	TO	PPG
1998	Sacramento	29	16	21.3	.395	.298	**.744**	2.9	0.8	0.5	0.3	1.9	**7.6**
1999	Minnesota	19	0	4.8	.304	.333	.500	1.1	0.3	0.3	0.0	0.4	1.1
2000	Cleveland	5	0	3.6	.600	.000	.500	0.4	0.8	0.0	0.0	0.4	1.6
2001	Cleveland	3	0	1.0	**1.000**	.000	.000	0.3	0.0	0.0	0.0	0.0	0.7
2002	Seattle	26	**17**	19.0	.333	.250	.517	3.9	1.1	**1.2**	0.3	1.0	3.5
2003	Seattle	16	16	**24.8**	.381	.387	.571	**4.1**	**1.4**	0.7	**0.4**	1.1	5.5
2004^{†}	Seattle	**34**	2	11.8	.304	**.500**	.710	1.9	0.0	0.7	0.1	0.7	2.0
Career	7 years, 4 teams	132	51	15.3	.366	.337	.632	2.6	0.9	0.7	0.2	1.0	3.8

==== Playoffs ====
Year	Team	GP	GS	MPG	FG%	3P%	FT%	RPG	APG	SPG	BPG	TO	PPG
2000	Cleveland	4	0	1.5	**.500**	.000	.000	0.3	0.5	0.0	0.0	0.3	0.5
2002	Seattle	2	**2**	**25.0**	.444	**.500**	.000	**4.0**	**1.5**	**1.5**	0.0	3.5	**5.0**
2004^{†}	Seattle	**6**	0	6.5	.273	.000	**.250**	1.3	0.8	0.5	**0.2**	0.2	1.2
Career	3 years, 2 teams	12	2	7.9	.364	.400	.250	1.4	0.8	0.5	0.1	0.8	1.6

== Head coaching record ==
Record table
Season	Team	Overall	Conference	Standing	Postseason
Arizona Wildcats (Pac-12 Conference) (2016–2024)
2016–17	Arizona	14–16	5–13	T–9th	
2017–18	Arizona	6–24	2–16	11th	
2018–19	Arizona	24–13	7–11	8th	WNIT Champions
2019–20	Arizona	24–7	12–6	4th	Postseason not held
2020–21	Arizona	21–6	13–4	2nd	NCAA Runner-up
2021–22	Arizona	21–8	10–6	4th	NCAA Second Round
2022–23	Arizona	22–10	11–7	T–4th	NCAA Second Round
2023–24	Arizona	18–16	8–10	7th	NCAA First Round
Arizona Wildcats (Big 12 Conference) (2024–2025)
2024–25	Arizona	19–14	10–8	8th	WBIT First Round
Arizona:		169–114 (.597)	78–81 (.491)		
SMU Mustangs (Atlantic Coast Conference) (2025–present)
2025–26	SMU	9–21	2–16	16th	
2026–27	SMU	2–0	0–0		
SMU:		11–21 (.344)	2–16 (.111)		
Total:		180–135 (.571)			
National champion Postseason invitational champion Conference regular season champion Conference regular season and conference tournament champion Division regular season champion Division regular season and conference tournament champion Conference tournament champion

== Awards and achievements ==
- 1995—Pac-10 Conference Freshman of the Year
- 1996—WNIT Most Valuable Player
- 1998—Pac-10 Conference Player of the Year
- 1998—AP All-American (third team)
- 1998—U.S. Basketball Writers Association All-American (first team)
- University of Arizona—Points scored career 2237
- University of Arizona—Points scored single season 653
- University of Arizona—Points scored single game 35
- University of Arizona—Rebounds career 921
- 2003—Inducted into the University of Arizona Hall of Fame

== Personal life ==
On July 4, 2012, Barnes married Salvo Coppa, a basketball coach she met in Italy. They have two children.
