= Arizona Wildcats women's basketball =

University of Arizona team

2026–27 Arizona Wildcats women's basketball team
- University: University of Arizona
- First season: 1972; 54 years ago
- Head coach: Becky Burke (2nd season)
- Location: Tucson, Arizona
- Arena: McKale Center (capacity: 14,545)
- Conference: Big 12
- Nickname: Wildcats
- Colors: Cardinal and navy
- All-time record: 733–793–0 (.480)

NCAA Division I tournament runner-up
- 2021
Other NCAA Division I tournament results
Final Four	2021
Elite Eight	2021
Sweet Sixteen	1998, 2021
Appearances	1997, 1998, 1999, 2000, 2003, 2004, 2005, 2021, 2022, 2023, 2024

NWIT champions
- 1996

WNIT champions
- 2019

Uniforms
Home	Away

The Arizona Wildcats women's basketball program is the official women's basketball program at the University of Arizona in Tucson, Arizona. Basketball is one of eleven women's sports at the University of Arizona. The team is a Division I member of the National Collegiate Athletic Association (NCAA) and the Big 12 athletic conference. The team's home venue is the McKale Center, which seats 14,545 fans. The official team colors are cardinal red and navy blue. The Wildcats have qualified for eight NCAA Tournaments. On August 4, 2023, Arizona announced it would join the Big 12 Conference along with Arizona State, Colorado, and Utah beginning in the 2024–25 academic year.

For most of its history, the women's basketball program has been playing in the shadow of its men's counterpart, leading to many losing seasons. However, in recent years, the women's team has been improving their success in winning, mostly due to coaching regime and talent, and captured the Women's National Invitational Tournament (WNIT) championship in 2019. They made the Final Four for the first time in 2021 and defeated UConn to qualify for the National Championship game. They would lose to Stanford in the National Championship.

== Program history ==
Female students at the University of Arizona first requested a women's basketball team in 1912, but were denied. Women played "inter-class" games for the first time in 1921. The juniors won. The following year, the school organized games with players from sororities and dormitories. Intercollegiate competition began in 1923, and a "Varsity" team played Arizona State University. This system persisted until 1971, when the UA joined the Association of Intercollegiate Athletics for Women (AIAW) as a charter member.

The team was a member of the Intermountain Conference. The University of Arizona Athletic Department cites the first official season of women's basketball at the University of Arizona as the 1972–73 season, following the Title IX federal legislation that requires state-supported institutions to offer equal opportunity to men's and women's programs. The team finished their first season with a winning 8–4 record. In 1979, the University of Arizona, along with Arizona State University and five schools in southern California joined to form the Western Collegiate Athletic Association.

The team became a member of the NCAA in 1981, when the NCAA absorbed the AIAW. In 1985, the school joined the Pacific-West Conference, which became the Pac-10 the following season and the Pac-12 in 2011. As of the outset of the 2015–16 season, the all-time team record was 537–642. The Wildcats were runners-up at the Pac-10 Conference championship tournament in 2003 and 2004, marking their most successful conference finishes. The team made appearances in the NCAA Tournament in 1997, 1998, 1999, 2000, 2003, 2004, 2005 and 2021 and in the Women's National Invitational Tournament in 1996, 2001, 2011, and 2019, while winning it all in 1996 and 2019.

In 2021, the team beat UConn in the Final Four of the NCAA Women's Basketball championship. They lost the championship game against Stanford 53–54.

Becky Burke took over as the head coach at Arizona on April 14, 2025.

== Season-by-season results ==
Record table
Season	Team	Overall	Conference	Standing	Postseason
Lois Sheldahl (Intermountain Athletic Conference) (1972–1974)
1972–73	Lois Sheldahl	8–4			
1973–74	Lois Sheldahl	11–4			
Lois Sheldahl:		19–8 (.704)			
Nancy Trego (Intermountain Athletic Conference) (1974–1978)
1974–75	Nancy Trego	12–4	9–2	T-2nd	
1975–76	Nancy Trego	6–8	6–7		
1976–77	Nancy Trego	3–13	3–11		
1977–78	Nancy Trego	4–13	3–10		
Nancy Trego:		25–38 (.397)	21–30 (.412)		
Lori Woodman (Intermountain Athletic Conference) (1978–1979)
1978–79	Lori Woodman	6–18	5–8	T-8th	
Lori Woodman:		6–18 (.250)	5–8 (.385)		
Lori Woodman (WCAA) (1979–1980)
1979–80	Lori Woodman	9–17	1–11	7th	
Lori Woodman:		9–17 (.346)	1–11 (.083)		
Judy LeWinter (WCAA) (1980–1985)
1980–81	Judy LeWinter	2–21	1–11	7th	
1981-82	Judy LeWinter	10–21	0–12	7th	
1982-83	Judy LeWinter	10–17	2–12	T-7th	
1983-84	Judy LeWinter	8–20	1–13	T-7th	
1984-85	Judy LeWinter	7–21	1–13	8th	
Judy LeWinter:		37–100 (.270)	5–61 (.076)		
Wendy Larry (PacWest) (1985–1986)
1985–86	Wendy Larry	19–9	4–4	T-2nd	
Wendy Larry:		19–9 (.679)	4–4 (.500)		
Wendy Larry (Pac-10) (1986–1987)
1986–87	Wendy Larry	11–18	4–14	T-8th	
Wendy Larry:		11–18 (.379)	4–14 (.222)		
June Olkowski (Pac-10) (1987–1991)
1987–88	June Olkowski	5–23	2–16	10th	
1988–89	June Olkowski	11–17	6–12	T-8th	
1989–90	June Olkowski	12–17	5–13	T-8th	
1990–91	June Olkowski	6–25	1–17	10th	
June Olkowski:		34–82 (.293)	14–58 (.194)		
Joan Bonvicini (Pac-10) (1991–2008)
1991–92	Joan Bonvicini	9–19	3–15	10th	
1992–93	Joan Bonvicini	13–14	7–11	8th	
1993–94	Joan Bonvicini	15–12	8–10	7th	
1994–95	Joan Bonvicini	11–19	6–12	7th	
1995–96	Joan Bonvicini	22–8	10–8	T-3rd	
1996–97	Joan Bonvicini	23–8	12–6	T-4th	NCAA Division I Round of 32
1997–98	Joan Bonvicini	23–7	14–4	T-2nd	NCAA Division I Sweet 16
1998–99	Joan Bonvicini	18–11	12–6	4th	NCAA Division I Round of 32
1999-00	Joan Bonvicini	25–7	13–5	T-2nd	NCAA Division I Round of 32
2000–01	Joan Bonvicini	20–12	9–9	5th	
2001–02	Joan Bonvicini	14–14	10–8	T-6th	
2002–03	Joan Bonvicini	21–8	12–4	T-2nd	NCAA Division I First Round
2003–04	Joan Bonvicini	24–9	14–4	T-1st	NCAA Division I First Round
2004–05	Joan Bonvicini	20–12	11–7	5th	NCAA Division I Round of 32
2005–06	Joan Bonvicini	8–22	3–15	9th	
2006–07	Joan Bonvicini	11–21	4–14	10th	
2007–08	Joan Bonvicini	10–20	4–14	T-8th	
Joan Bonvicini:		287–223 (.563)	152–152 (.500)		
Niya Butts (Pac-10/Pac-12) (2008–2016)
2008–09	Niya Butts	12–19	4–14	T-8th	
2009–10	Niya Butts	14–17	6–12	8th	
2010–11	Niya Butts	21–12	10–8	4th	WNIT First Round
2011–12	Niya Butts	15–17	3–15	12th	
2012–13	Niya Butts	12–18	4–14	T-10th	
2013–14	Niya Butts	5–25	1–12	12th	
2014–15	Niya Butts	10–20	3–15	T-11th	
2015–16	Niya Butts	13–19	3–15	11th	
Niya Butts:		102–147 (.410)	34–105 (.245)		
Adia Barnes (Pac-12 Conference) (2016–2024)
2016–17	Adia Barnes	14–16	5–13	T-9th	
2017–18	Adia Barnes	6–24	2–16	11th	
2018–19	Adia Barnes	24–13	7–11	8th	WNIT champions
2019–20	Adia Barnes	24–7	12–6	4th	Postseason not held
2020–21	Adia Barnes	21–6	13–4	3rd	NCAA Runner-Up
2021–22	Adia Barnes	21–8	10–6	4th	NCAA Division I Round of 32
2022–23	Adia Barnes	22–10	11–7	4th	NCAA Division I Round of 32
2023–24	Adia Barnes	18–15	8–10	7th	NCAA First Round
Adia Barnes (Big 12 Conference) (2024–2025)
2024–25	Adia Barnes	19–14	10–8	8th	
Adia Barnes:		169–114 (.597)	78–81 (.491)		
Becky Burke (Big 12 Conference) (2025–present)
2025–26	Becky Burke	12–18	3–15	15th	
2026–27	Becky Burke	3–1			
Becky Burke:		15–19 (.441)	3–15 (.167)		
Total:		733–793 (.480)	378–587 (.392)		
National champion Postseason invitational champion Conference regular season champion Conference regular season and conference tournament champion Division regular season champion Division regular season and conference tournament champion Conference tournament champion

=== Playing abroad ===
The Wildcats have played in Australia, France, Puerto Rico, and Italy.

== Head coaches ==
Name	Years	Seasons	Won	Lost	Pct.
Lois Sheldahl	1972–1974	2	19	8	.704
Frankie Porter	1974–1978	4	25	38	.397
Lori Woodman	1978–1989	2	15	35	.300
Judy LeWinter	1980–1985	5	37	100	.270
Wendy Larry	1985–1987	2	30	27	.526
June Olkowski	1987–1991	4	34	82	.293
Joan Bonvicini	1991–2008	17	287	223	.563
Niya Butts	2008–2016	8	102	147	.410
Adia Barnes	2016–2025	9	169	114	.597
Becky Burke	2025–present	2	15	19	.438
All-Time		54	733	793	.480

== 2026–27 roster ==
2026–27 Arizona Wildcats women's basketball team
Players
Coaches

Pos.	#	Name	Height	Year	Previous school	Hometown
G	3	Sumayah Sugapong	5 ft 7 in (1.7 m)	Sr	UC San Diego	San Diego, CA
G	5	Molly Ladwing	5 ft 9 in (1.75 m)	So	Skutt Catholic	Omaha, NE
G	--	Aliyahna Morris	5 ft 5 in (1.65 m)	So	California	Rancho Cucamonga, CA
F/C	—-	Gerda Raulušaityte	6 ft 2 in (1.88 m)	Sr	USC	Varėna, Lithuania
G	--	Breanna Williams	5 ft 9 in (1.75 m)	RS So	Maryland	Billings, MT
F	--	Anastasiia Semenova	6 ft 2 in (1.88 m)	RS Sr	Boston University	St. Petersburg, Russia
G	—-	Arynn Finley	5 ft 10 in (1.78 m)	Fr	Etiwanda HS	Rancho Cucamonga, CA
G	—-	Jasleen Green	5 ft 8 in (1.73 m)	Fr	Grandview Prep	Ocala, FL
G/F	—-	Makayla Presser-Palmer	5 ft 11 in (1.8 m)	Fr	Northwestern High School	East Springfield, PA
F	—-	Callie Hinder	6 ft 6 in (1.98 m)	Fr	Phoenix PPH Prep (AZ)	Sydney, Australia
G	--	Priyanka Ponnam	6 ft 2 in (1.88 m)	Fr	Blair Academy	Pennington, NJ
G	--	Karolina Ulan	6 ft 1 in (1.85 m)	Fr	VBW Gdynia	Warsaw, Poland

Head coach

- Becky Burke (Louisville)

Assistant coach(es)

- Todd Starkey (Montreat)
- Julie Hairgrove (Arizona)
- James Ewing (Mercyhurst)
- Jenna Knudson (Embry-Riddle)
- Devan Newman (Louisville)

Legend

- (C) Team captain
- (S) Suspended
- (I) Ineligible
- (W) Walk-on
- Injured
- Current redshirt

Roster
Last update: April 28, 2026

== 2026–27 coaching staff ==
Name	Position	Seasons at Arizona
Becky Burke	Head coach	2nd
Todd Starkey	Associate head coach	1st
James Ewing	Assistant coach	2nd
Julie Brase-Hairgrove	Assistant coach	2nd
Jenna Knudson	Assistant coach	2nd
Devan Newman	Assistant coach	1st

== Postseason appearances ==
=== NCAA tournament results ===
The Wildcats have appeared in the NCAA Tournament eleven times. Their combined record is 14–11.

Year	Seed	Round	Opponent	Result
1997	No. 7	First Round; Second Round	No. 10 Western Kentucky; No. 2 Georgia	W 76−54; L 74−80
1998	No. 3	First Round; Second Round; Sweet Sixteen	No. 14 Santa Clara; No. 6 Virginia; No. 2 UConn	W 75−63; W 94−77; L 57−74
1999	No. 6	First Round; Second Round	No. 11 Florida; No. 3 Rutgers	W 87−84 (OT); L 47−90
2000	No. 8	First Round; Second Round	No. 9 Kent State; No. 1 Tennessee	W 73−61; L 60−75
2003	No. 6	First Round	No. 11 Notre Dame	L 47−59
2004	No. 9	First Round	No. 8 Michigan State	L 60−72
2005	No. 9	First Round; Second Round	No. 8 Oklahoma; No. 1 LSU	W 72−69; L 43−76
2021	No. 3	First Round; Second Round; Sweet Sixteen; Elite Eight; Final Four; National Championship	No. 14 Stony Brook; No. 11 BYU; No. 2 Texas A&M; No. 4 Indiana; No. 1 UConn; No. 1 Stanford	W 79–44; W 52–46; W 74–59; W 66–53; W 69–59; L 53–54
2022	No. 4	First Round; Second Round	No. 13 UNLV; No. 5 North Carolina	W 72–67; L 45–63
2023	No. 7	First Round; Second Round	No. 10 West Virginia; No. 2 Maryland	W 75–62; L 64–77
2024	No. 11	First Four; First round	No. 11 Auburn; No. 6 Syracuse	W 69–59; L 69-74

=== WNIT results ===
The Wildcats have appeared In the Women's National Invitation Tournament three times. The combined record is 7 – 2.

Year	Round	Opponent	Result
2001	First	Pepperdine	W 85–65
2001	Second	New Mexico	L 75–62
2011	First	Utah State	L 103–95
2019	Round 1	Idaho State	W 66–56
2019	Round 2	Pacific	W 64–48
2019	Round 3	Idaho	W 68–60
2019	Quarterfinals	Wyoming	W 67–45
2019	Semifinals	TCU	W 59–53
2019	Championship	Northwestern	W 56–42

=== WBIT results ===
The Wildcats have appeared In the Women's Basketball Invitation Tournament first time. The combined record is 0 – 1.

Year	Round	Opponent	Result
2025	First	Northern Arizona	L 71–69

== Players and coaches ==
=== Wildcats in international competition ===
The following Arizona Wildcats women's basketball players and coaches have represented their country in basketball in international competition (excluding Olympics):

== National honors and accomplishments ==
The individual honors, awards, and accomplishments listed in the succeeding subsections are aggregated by player in the following table. Players with only all-conference honors (other than conference player of the year), lower than first-team All-America honors, or later than second-round draft positions are not included.

== See also ==
- Arizona Wildcats men's basketball
