= Kelly Graves =

American basketball coach (born 1963)

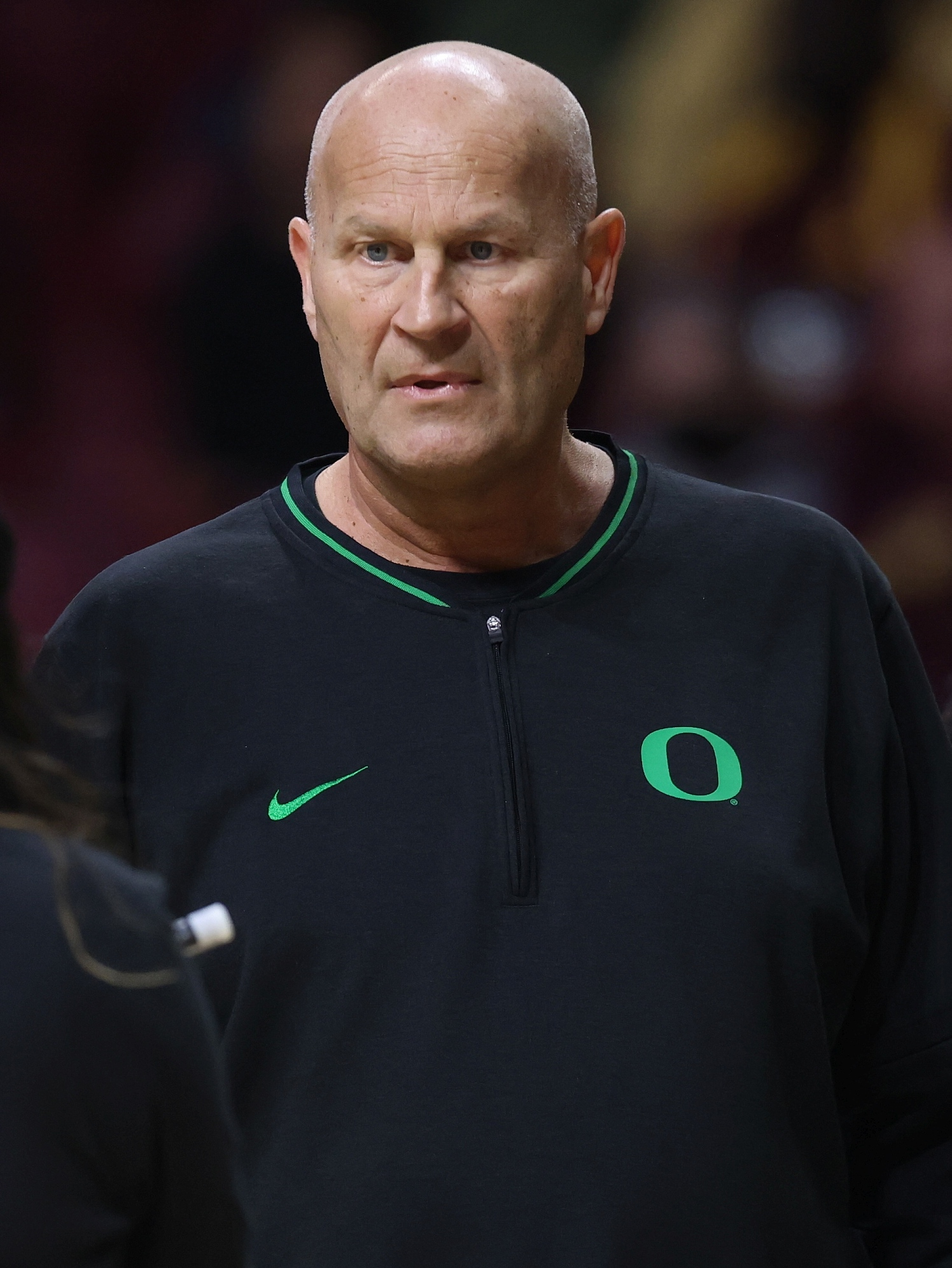
- Graves with Oregon in 2025

Current position
- Title: Head coach
- Team: Oregon
- Conference: Big Ten
- Record: 264–136 (.660)

Biographical details
- Born: January 14, 1963 (age 63); Salt Lake City, Utah, U.S.

Playing career
- 1983–1985: Ricks JC
- 1985–1987: New Mexico
- Position: Guard

Coaching career (HC unless noted)
- 1988–1989: New Mexico (men's GA)
- 1989–1992: Big Bend CC
- 1992–1996: Portland (asst.)
- 1996–1997: Saint Mary's (asst.)
- 1997–2000: Saint Mary's
- 2000–2014: Gonzaga
- 2014–present: Oregon

Head coaching record
- Overall: 646–298 (.684)

Accomplishments and honors

Championships
- NCAA Regional—Final Four (2019); 2× Pac-12 Tournament (2018, 2020); 3× Pac-12 regular season (2018, 2019, 2020); 7× WCC Tournament (1999, 2007, 2009–2011, 2013, 2014); 10× WCC regular season (2005–2014)

Awards
- 8× WCC Coach of the Year (2003, 2005, 2007, 2008, 2010, 2011, 2013, 2014); 2× Pac-12 Coach of the Year (2018 media, 2019 coaches)
Medal record
Coach for Women's Basketball
United States (assistant coach)
FIBA Americas Under-18 Championship
Gold medal – first place	2012 Gurabo	Team
FIBA Under-19 World Championship
Gold medal – first place	2013 Lithuania	Team

Kelly Lee Graves (born January 14, 1963) is the current head women's basketball coach at the University of Oregon. Previously, Graves was the head women's basketball coach at St. Mary's from 1997 to 2000, as well as Gonzaga University from 2000 to 2014. He was formerly an assistant coach for the Portland Pilots (1994–1997) and St. Mary Gaels, where he later got his first head coaching stint with the Gaels from 1997 to 2000. From the 2004–05 season to the 2013–14 season, he guided Gonzaga to ten consecutive West Coast Conference regular season titles. The 2007 team went 13–1 in conference play, and later won the WCC conference tournament. The school also received its first ever NCAA tournament appearance. He was named WCC co-coach of the year for his accomplishments. In 2005, 2010, and 2011, Gonzaga went undefeated in WCC regular season play.

== Rankings ==
In 2005, Gonzaga was ranked 23rd in the nation, which was its highest ranking ever in the polls. At the end of the 2009–2010 season, the Zags was ranked 12th in the final poll, which was their highest ranking ever in the polls. At the end of the 2010–2011 season, the Zags was ranked 8th in the final poll, which is their highest ranking ever in the polls.

== Regular season by years ==
=== St. Mary's Gaels (1997–2000) ===
Graves led the Gaels to a winning season in the first season of coaching with a 19–9, 9–4 in WCC play, tied for fourth in the conference. The next year, Graves led the Gaels to their first ever NCAA tournament with a 27–7 record and tied for 1st in the WCC regular season conference. In his final year as coach of the Gaels, Graves led the Gaels to a WNIT and lost in the second round.

=== Gonzaga Bulldogs (2000–2014) ===
In April 2000, Graves was named head coach for Gonzaga. In his 14 years as coach for the Bulldogs, Graves turned the program from a last-place finish in the WCC to a national contender. For the past 10 years, Gonzaga have won or co-shared the regular season WCC title and the last six out of seven years, Gonzaga had made it into the NCAA tournament, with the WCC first ever at-large bid in the 2011–2012 basketball season. On April 7, 2014, Oregon named Graves as their head coach. On April 14, 2014, assistant coach Lisa Mispley Fortier succeeded Graves as head coach.

=== Oregon Ducks (2014–present) ===
On April 7, 2014, Oregon named Graves as their head coach, succeeding Paul Westhead, who was let go at the end of the 2013–14 season. The Ducks finished Graves's first season as head coach with a 13–17 record, 6–12 in the Pac-12, which was Graves' first losing season since his second year as head coach for the Gonzaga Bulldogs in the 2001–02 season. In his second season, the team achieved a 24–11 record and made it to the WNIT semi-finals, where they lost to eventual champion South Dakota Coyotes 88–54. The next season, Graves led the Ducks to the Elite 8, where they lost to the Connecticut Huskies 90–52. The Ducks also reached the Elite 8 the next year, where they lost to the Notre Dame Fighting Irish 84–74 to finish 33–5, the most wins in program history. The next year, the Ducks reached to the Final Four for the first time in program history and their season ended with a 72–67 loss to Baylor in the national semifinals to finish the season with a 33–5 record.

== NCAA Tournament runs ==
=== 2006–07 season and Gonzaga's first NCAA tournament appearance ===
In the 2006–07 season in West Coast Conference play, Gonzaga guided to a 13–1 record in conference play. The lone loss was against Pepperdine at McCarthey Athletic Center. In the middle of the season, future All-American Courtney Vandersloot signed with the Zags. In the WCC tournament, Gonzaga defeated Portland, San Francisco, and LMU to go to their first ever NCAA tournament. In the NCAA tournament, Gonzaga played against Middle Tennessee State and they suffered an 85–46 loss at Stanford, where they finished their season with a 24–10 record.

=== 2008–09 season and Gonzaga's first NCAA tournament victory ===
A couple of years later in the 2008–09 season in WCC play, Gonzaga guided with a 12–2 record in conference play, with a loss to Portland at home and Pepperdine on the road. In the WCC tournament, Gonzaga defeated LMU and San Diego to go to their second NCAA tournament. In the 2009 NCAA Division I women's basketball tournament, Graves guided Gonzaga to its first ever NCAA tournament victory over Xavier 74–59 at Alaska Airlines Arena at Hec Edmundson Pavilion in Seattle, WA. They would unfortunately lose to University of Pittsburgh 65–60 in the second round.

=== 2009–10 season and Gonzaga's first ever Sweet 16 ===
In the 2009–10 season in West Coast Conference play, forward Heather Bowman broke the WCC and Gonzaga women's basketball school record of 2,133 points during the 2009–10 season. Gonzaga went undefeated in West Coast Conference with a perfect 14–0 record and unbeaten in West Coast Conference tournament in Las Vegas, NV. In the 2010 NCAA Division I women's basketball tournament, Graves guided Gonzaga to an 82–76 first round victory over Hall of Fame coach Sylvia Hatchell's University of North Carolina Tar Heels women's basketball team and a 72–71 second-round victory over Gary Blair's Texas A&M Aggies women's basketball team on Vivian Frieson's game winning shot with 15 seconds left in the game. This marks the first appearance in the Sweet 16 for the Zags. Gonzaga played against Xavier women's basketball team and lost 74–56 at ARCO Arena in Sacramento.

=== 2010–11 and Gonzaga's magical run in the NCAA tournament ===
The next year, Gonzaga went undefeated in West Coast Conference with a perfect 14–0 record for the second year in a row and unbeaten in the WCC tournament in Las Vegas. In the 2011 NCAA Division I women's basketball tournament, Graves guided Gonzaga to a 92–86 victory over Lisa Bluder's University of Iowa women's basketball team and an 89–75 victory over Nikki Caldwell's UCLA Bruins. Both games were held at the McCarthey Athletic Center. In the UCLA game, senior guard Courtney Vandersloot became the first Division I women's or men's basketball player to score 2,000 points and tally 1,000 assists in their career. The Zags won 76–69 over Jeff Walz's Louisville Cardinals to set up their first ever Elite 8 matchup against Tara Vanderveer's Stanford Cardinals. Gonzaga's season ended with an 83–60 loss and the loss ended Courtney Vandersloot's magical career. At the end of the season, the University of Washington was interested in hiring Graves for head coach, but Graves wasn't interested in the job and he decides to stay with Gonzaga. At the end of March 2011, Gonzaga signed an extension for Graves to coach the women's team until the 2020–2021 season.

=== The post-Vandersloot era and 2012 NCAA tournament ===
The next year, the Zags went through the conference with a 14–2 with their first WCC loss in nearly three years at home to St. Mary's and a 30-point loss to Jeff Judkins' BYU Cougars, which is their biggest loss in nearly 10 years. The Zags won against the St. Mary's Gaels and lost to the BYU Cougars. The Cougars were automatically selected to the NCAA Tournament, while the Zags had to wait and see if they are in the tournament or not. Since Gonzaga is one of 16 locations to host the first and second rounds of the NCAA tournament, Gonzaga was picked as a #11 seed in the Kingston region as an at-large bid, the first in WCC women's basketball history. This is Gonzaga's fourth consecutive NCAA tournament. The Zags defeated Hall of Fame coach C. Vivian Stringer's Rutgers Scarlet Knights 86–73 and a 65–54 victory over Katie Meier's Miami Hurricanes to make their third consecutive Sweet 16 appearance. Both games were held at the McCarthey Athletic Center. Gonzaga lost to Matthew Mitchell's Kentucky Wildcats 79–62 to end their season on 28–6.

=== 2012–13 season and 2013 NCAA tournament ===
The next year, Gonzaga went 15–1 in conference play with the lone loss at St. Mary's by a final of 54–51. Gonzaga picked up their ninth consecutive regular crown with a 66–55 win over BYU at their homecourt, where the Zags will be the #1 seed in the WCC tournament. Gonzaga defeated BYU 62–43 and defeated San Diego 62–50 to win their fifth WCC Tournament title and they are guaranteed to play at the McCarthey Athletic Center, where they will host Bill Fennelly's Iowa State Cyclones.

The Zags played against Iowa State in a sold-out crowd of 6,000; mostly Zags fans. The Zags lost to the Cyclones 72–60, which ended their 15-game winning streak, four straight NCAA Tournament victories at McCarthey Athletic Center, and four consecutive first round victories. The Zags ended the year with a 27–6 record.

=== 2013–14 regular season/final season at Gonzaga and 2014 NCAA tournament ===
The next year, Gonzaga went 10–2 in non-conference. The biggest highlight in non-conference was the Ohio State game at Value City Arena, where Shaniqua Nilles scored the final four points of the game for the Zags, including the game winning jumper as time expired, where the Zags escaped with a 59–58 win.

The Zags went 16–2 in conference play with both losses on the road at St. Mary's by a final of 79–78 in overtime on December 28, which was the start of West Coast Conference and at BYU on February 15 by a final of 62–52. Gonzaga picked up their tenth consecutive regular season crown with a 75–65 win over Saint Mary's at McCarthey Athletic Center on February 27, where the Zags will be the #1 seed in the WCC tournament. Gonzaga defeated San Francisco 81–68, defeated Saint Mary's 68–60, and defeated BYU 71–57 to win their sixth WCC Tournament title. Gonzaga was selected as a #6 seed, where they played against James Madison University at Reed Arena at the University of Texas A&M campus, where they lost to the Dukes 72–63 to end their season at 29–5 and Graves' 14 years run as head coach for the Zags.

=== 2014–2015 season and rebuilding project at Oregon ===
Kelly Graves was introduced as the head coach of the Oregon Ducks women's basketball on April 7, 2014. The Oregon Ducks opened up the Kelly Graves era with a 100–77 win over Utah State. The Ducks finished non-conference with a 7–4 record. Graves picked up his first career Pac-12 victory with a 62–46 over the UCLA Bruins at the Pauley Pavilion. The Ducks finished their season with a 13–17 record, Graves' first losing season since his second year at Gonzaga back in the 2001–2002 season. Graves finished Pac-12 Conference with a 6–12 record.

=== 2015–16 season and 2016 WNIT ===
The Ducks finished non-conference season undefeated, which featured a 79–77 upset over #22 North Carolina, Kelly Graves' 400th career win against North Dakota State, and the Ducks' largest margin of victory (122–59) since the 1978–79 season. The Ducks finished with a 9–9 record in Pac-12 play to finish sixth place. The Ducks lost to the Arizona Wildcats 74–68 in the opening game of the Pac-12 Tournament at KeyArena in Seattle on March 3.

The Ducks were selected to the WNIT, where they hosted the Long Beach State 49ers. The Ducks defeated the 49ers 84–76 to play at Fresno State on March 21. The Ducks defeated Fresno State 84–59 to play against their Pac-12 rival Utah Utes, who defeated Graves' former team, the Gonzaga Bulldogs, 92–77. The Ducks defeated the Utah Utes 73–63 to advance to the WNIT quarterfinals to play against UTEP. The next game, the Ducks defeated the UTEP Miners 71–67 after trailing 27–9 with approximately 8 minutes left in the first half against the Miners. The next game, the Ducks trailed throughout the game and lost to the South Dakota Coyotes in the WNIT semifinals 88–54 to end their season at 24–11. The 24 wins is the most in a season since 2001–2002, where former Oregon coach Bev Smith led the Ducks to a 22-win season.

=== 2016–17: The Ionescu era begins ===
Graves led his youngest Ducks team in their women's basketball program history by starting three freshmen, most notably future Ducks icon Sabrina Ionescu. They finished non-conference with a 10–2 record, and finishing in sixth place for Pac-12 play with an 8–10 record. The Ducks received an at-large bid for the NCAA tournament as a #10 seed, their first bid since the 2005 season. The Ducks defeated #7 Temple 71–70 and #2 Duke 74–65 at Cameron Indoor Stadium to advance to their first ever Sweet 16 in program history. The Ducks continued making history, playing against Brenda Frese's Maryland Terrapins by winning 77–63 to advance to their first ever Elite 8 appearance. This was the second time Graves led a double digit seed team to an Elite 8 appearance, where he led the Zags to one six years earlier. The Ducks ended their season at 23–14 with a 90–52 loss to the UConn Huskies.

=== 2017–18 season and 2018 NCAA tournament ===
Graves led the Ducks to a record of 27–4 and their first Pac-12 title for women's basketball in 18 years with a 16–2 record in Pac-12 play. As a sophomore, Ionescu set a record for most career triple-doubles in NCAA women's basketball, ending the season with 10. The Ducks won their first ever Pac-12 Tournament title with wins over Colorado, UCLA, and Stanford. The Ducks were selected as the #2 seed in the Spokane region. The Ducks defeated the Seattle Redhawks 88–45 and the Minnesota Golden Gophers 101–73 at Matthew Knight Arena. The Ducks made it to the regional round for the second consecutive year, which marked a homecoming for Graves, who was head coach for the Zags from 2000 to 2014. The Ducks defeated Central Michigan 83–69 to advance to the Elite 8 for the second year in a row, facing against the top-seeded Notre Dame Fighting Irish. The Ducks' season came to a close with an 84–74 loss to eventual national champion Notre Dame to finish the season with a 33–5 record. The 33 wins were the most in program history.

=== 2018–19 season and Kelly Graves'/Oregon Ducks women's basketball first ever appearance in the Final Four ===
Graves led the Ducks to their second consecutive Pac-12 regular season title with a 16–2 Pac-12 record and 27–3 overall.
The Ducks advanced to their second consecutive Pac-12 tournament title game, where they lost to Stanford 64–57.
The Ducks advanced to their third consecutive NCAA tournament appearance as an at-large bid.
The Ducks defeated Portland State and Indiana at Matthew Knight Arena to advance to their third consecutive Sweet 16 and travel to Portland for the regionals.
Oregon advanced to their first ever Final Four berth with wins over South Dakota State and Mississippi State.
The Ducks' magical season ended short with a 72–67 loss to Baylor in the national semifinals to finish the season with a 33–5 record.

=== 2019–20: Victory over U.S. WBB and 2K/1K/1K ===
The Ducks started off the 2019–20 season with a 93–86 exhibition win over the U.S. women's national basketball team. The Ducks became only the second team to beat the U.S. after the Tennessee Lady Volunteers defeated them 20 years earlier.

During the season, Ionescu became the first NCAA basketball player (male or female) to record 2,000 points, 1,000 assists, and 1,000 rebounds in a career. She had previously joined former Gonzaga great and current Chicago Sky player Courtney Vandersloot as the only NCAA players to reach said totals in points and assists. Ionescu reached the rebounding milestone on February 24, 2020, at #4 Stanford on what ESPN journalist M.A. Voepel called "a highly emotional day" for her; hours before the game, Ionescu had been a featured speaker at the memorial service for mentor and close personal friend Kobe Bryant. Despite battling the flu, she extended her NCAA career record for triple-doubles to 26 while leading the Ducks to a 74–66 win that secured the top seed in the 2020 Pac-12 tournament.
The Ducks won the Pac-12 Tournament title by defeating the Stanford Cardinal in the title game.
The Ducks season abruptly comes to an end, due to the coronavirus issue and the cancellation of postseason play, including NCAA basketball tournaments.

=== USA Basketball assistant coach ===
In April 2012, Graves was named as one of two assistant coaches for the U.S. U-18 basketball team, coached by Miami Hurricanes women's basketball coach Katie Meier. LSU women's basketball coach Nikki Caldwell is the other assistant coach. The U-18 basketball won gold medal against Brazil, 71–47, which was their sixth straight gold medal.

For the second straight year, Graves was named assistant coach, but this time for the USA U-19 women's basketball team. The USA U-19 team won their seventh straight gold medal with a 61–28 win over France.

== Personal life ==
Graves is married to Mary (née Winters) since 1994 and they have three sons: Max, Jackson, and Will. Max graduated from University of Oregon in 2017 and became a high school teacher and basketball coach in Arizona. Jackson became a women's basketball assistant coach for Lane Community College in Eugene. Will was formerly a walk-on basketball player for Mark Few's Gonzaga Bulldogs men's basketball team before transferring to Southern Oregon University in the 2022 offseason.

== Notable former players ==
- Jillian Alleyne – Oregon women's basketball all-time double-doubles record holder (2014–2016) under Graves. Currently playing for the Phoenix Mercury.
- Heather Bowman – Gonzaga women's basketball all-time leading scorer (2006–2010). Inducted into the WCC Hall of Fame in 2020 for women's basketball. Currently a financial advisor for a banking industry in Spokane.
- Ruthy Hebard – Oregon player (2016–2020). #8 pick in the 2020 WNBA draft, selected by the Chicago Sky.
- Sabrina Ionescu – Oregon player (2016–2020). Selected as the #1 pick in the 2020 WNBA draft by the New York Liberty. Was selected USBWA National Freshman of the Year in 2017; Pac-12 Player of the Year from 2018 to 2020 Nancy Lieberman Award recipient from 2018 to 2020. set NCAA all-divisions women's record for career triple-doubles in December 2017; set NCAA all-divisions record for triple-doubles in a season in 2018–19 and equaled this record in 2019–20; recipient of the Wooden Award and Wade Trophy in 2019 and 2020. Only player in NCAA history with 2,000 points, 1,000 assists, and 1,000 rebounds in their career.
- Tracy (Johnston) Sanders – Saint Mary's women's basketball player (1997–2000). Currently the head coach for the Southern Utah Thunderbirds after serving assistant coach for the Saint Mary's Gaels from 2006 to 2018.
- JR Payne – Saint Mary's women's basketball player (1997–1999). Currently head coach for fellow Pac-12 rival Colorado Buffaloes women's basketball.
- Katelan Redmon – Gonzaga women's basketball player (2009–2012). Transferred to Gonzaga from University of Washington during the offseason in 2008. Currently owns a business called Unique You Fitness in the Spokane area.
- Satou Sabally – Oregon women's basketball player (2017–2020). Selected as the #2 pick in the 2020 WNBA Draft by the Dallas Wings.
- Elle Tinkle – Gonzaga women's basketball player (2012–2014) under Graves. Daughter of Oregon State Beavers men's basketball coach Wayne Tinkle.
- Courtney Vandersloot – Gonzaga women's basketball all-time assists leader and second-all-time leading scorer (2007–2011). She became the first player (either male or female) to score 2,000 points and 1,000 assists in their college basketball career. Formerly a WNBA player for the Chicago Sky from 2011 to 2022 and UMMC Ekaterinburg, during the off-season.
  Currently a WNBA player for the New York Liberty.

== Former assistants as head coaches ==
- Mark Campbell – Oregon assistant (2014–15), then associate head coach (2015–21). Currently head coach for TCU.
- Lisa Fortier – Gonzaga director of basketball operations (2004–2006), then assistant coach (2007–2014). Currently head coach for Gonzaga women's basketball, succeeding Graves.
- Jennifer Mountain – Gonzaga assistant coach (2001–2008). Formerly head coach for Santa Clara women's basketball from 2008 to 2014, assistant coach for Portland State women's basketball from 2014 to 2015, and head coach for Pacific University women's basketball from 2015 to 2017. Now color commentator for the Portland Pilots women's and men's basketball, as well as broadcasts for the Pac-12 Network, the WCC and Root Sports.
- JR Payne – Gonzaga assistant coach (2000–2005). Formerly head coach for Southern Utah University women's basketball from 2008 to 2014 and Santa Clara University women's basketball from 2014 to 2016. Currently head coach for Colorado Buffaloes women's basketball.
- Nicole Powell – Gonzaga assistant coach (2013–2014), then Oregon assistant coach (2014–2017). Later Grand Canyon head coach (2017–2020) and now head coach at UC Riverside.
- Julie Shaw – Gonzaga assistant coach (2011–2013). Formerly head coach for La Verne women's basketball from 2013 to 2017.

== Awards and honors ==
- WCC Head Coach of the Year – 8 times (2003, 2005, 2007, 2008, 2010, 2011, 2013, and 2014)
- WCC Regular Season and Tournament Champs – 6 times (2007, 2009, 2010, 2011, 2013, and 2014)
- WCC Regular Season Champs – 10 times (2005, 2006, 2007, 2008, 2009, 2010, 2011, 2012, 2013, and 2014)
- Pac-12 Regular and Tournament Season Champs – 2 times (2018 and 2020)
- Pac-12 Regular Season Champs – 3 times (2018, 2019 and 2020)

== Milestones ==
As Gonzaga head coach

- 100th career win- March 1, 2003 against the San Diego Toreros
- 100th win at Gonzaga- November 21, 2006 at Portland State University
- 200th career win- January 26, 2008 against the Portland Pilots
- 100th WCC win- February 28, 2008 at Santa Clara Broncos
- 200th win at Gonzaga- March 20, 2010 against the North Carolina Tar Heels in the NCAA Tournament at the Bank of America Arena in Seattle.
- 300th career win- November 17, 2011 at University of Idaho
- 300th win at Gonzaga- January 11, 2014 against the San Diego Toreros

As Oregon head coach

- 400th career win – November 28, 2015 against the North Dakota Fighting Hawks
- 100th win at Oregon – December 2, 2018 against the Long Beach State 49ers.
- 500th career win- February 24, 2019 against the USC Trojans

== Head coaching record ==
Record table
Season	Team	Overall	Conference	Standing	Postseason
Saint Mary's (WCC) (1997–2000)
1997–98	Saint Mary's	19–9	9–5	T–4th	
1998–99	Saint Mary's	27–7	9–5	T–2nd	NCAA First Round
1999–00	Saint Mary's	20–10	11–3	T–1st	WNIT First Round
Saint Mary's:		66–26 (.717)	29–13 (.690)		
Gonzaga Bulldogs (WCC) (2000–2014)
2000–01	Gonzaga	5–23	0–14	8th	
2001–02	Gonzaga	11–18	2–12	8th	
2002–03	Gonzaga	18–12	9–5	T–2nd	
2003–04	Gonzaga	18–12	10–4	T–2nd	WNIT First Round
2004–05	Gonzaga	28–4	14–0	1st	WNIT Second Round
2005–06	Gonzaga	16–14	11–3	T–1st	
2006–07	Gonzaga	24–10	13–1	1st	NCAA First Round
2007–08	Gonzaga	25–9	13–1	1st	WNIT Second Round
2008–09	Gonzaga	27–7	12–2	1st	NCAA Second Round
2009–10	Gonzaga	29–5	14–0	1st	NCAA Sweet Sixteen
2010–11	Gonzaga	31–5	14–0	1st	NCAA Elite Eight
2011–12	Gonzaga	28–6	14–2	1st	NCAA Sweet Sixteen
2012–13	Gonzaga	27–6	15–1	1st	NCAA First Round
2013–14	Gonzaga	29–5	16–2	1st	NCAA First Round
Gonzaga:		316–136 (.699)	157–47 (.770)		
Oregon Ducks (Pac-12) (2014–2024)
2014–15	Oregon	13–17	6–12	T–9th	
2015–16	Oregon	24–11	9–9	6th	WNIT Semifinals
2016–17	Oregon	23–14	8–10	6th	NCAA Elite Eight
2017–18	Oregon	33–5	16–2	1st	NCAA Elite Eight
2018–19	Oregon	31–5*	16–2	1st	NCAA Final Four
2019–20	Oregon	31–2	17–1	1st	Postseason not held
2020–21	Oregon	15–9	10–7	4th	NCAA Sweet Sixteen
2021–22	Oregon	20–12	11–6	2nd	NCAA First Round
2022-23	Oregon	20–15	7–11	T–8th	WNIT Great 8
2023-24	Oregon	11–21	2–16	12th	
Oregon Ducks (Big Ten) (2024–present)
2024–25	Oregon	20–12	10–8	T–8th	NCAA Second Round
2025–26	Oregon	23–13	8–10	11th	NCAA Second Round
Oregon:		264–136 (.660)	120–94 (.561)		
Total:		646–298 (.684)			
National champion Postseason invitational champion Conference regular season champion Conference regular season and conference tournament champion Division regular season champion Division regular season and conference tournament champion Conference tournament champion

* Graves was suspended for two wins during the 2018–19 season, which are not reflect in his overall record.

== See also ==
- List of college women's basketball career coaching wins leaders
