= Sabrina Ionescu =

American basketball player (born 1997)

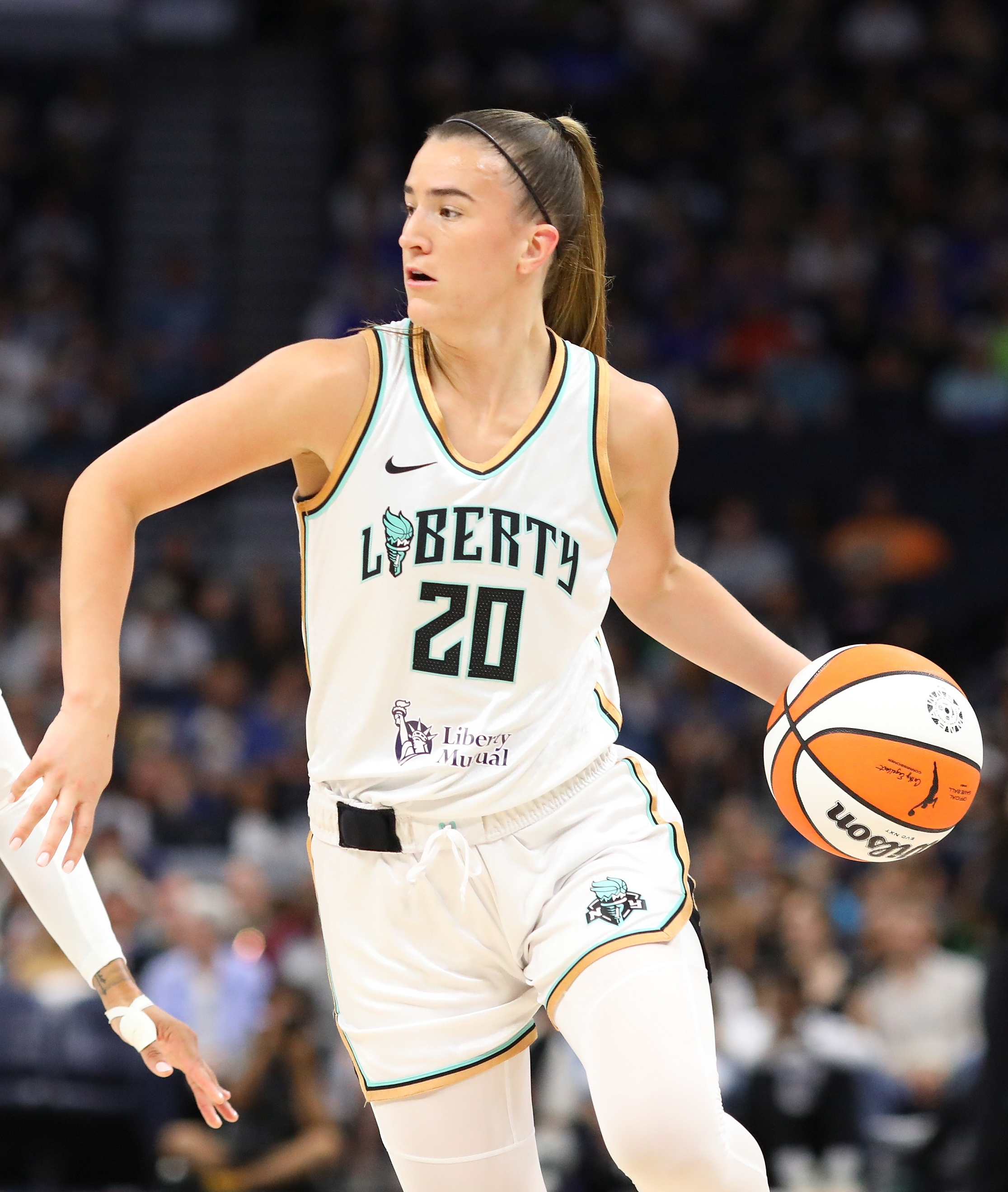
- Ionescu with the New York Liberty in 2025

No. 20 – New York Liberty
- Position: Point guard
- League: WNBA

Personal information
- Born: December 6, 1997 (age 28) Walnut Creek, California, U.S.
- Listed height: 5 ft 11 in (1.80 m)
- Listed weight: 165 lb (75 kg)

Career information
- High school: Miramonte (Orinda, California)
- College: Oregon (2016–2020)
- WNBA draft: 2020: 1st round, 1st overall pick
- Drafted by: New York Liberty
- Playing career: 2020–present

Career history
- 2020–present: New York Liberty
- 2025: Phantom BC

Career highlights
- WNBA champion (2024); 4× WNBA All-Star (2022–2025); 4× All-WNBA Second Team (2022–2025); 2× WNBA Three-Point Shootout champion (2023, 2025); WNBA Skills Challenge Champion (2022); 2× WNBA Commissioner's Cup Champion (2023, 2026); NCAA all-time leader in triple-doubles; AP Player of the Year (2020); Honda Sports Award (2020); James E. Sullivan Award (2020); 2× John R. Wooden Award (2019, 2020); Naismith College Player of the Year (2020); USBWA Player of the Year (2020); 2× Wade Trophy (2019, 2020); 3× Unanimous first-team All-American (2018–2020); Senior CLASS Award (2020); 3× Nancy Lieberman Award (2018–2020); USBWA National Freshman of the Year (2017); 3× Pac-12 Player of the Year (2018–2020); 4× All-Pac-12 (2017–2020); Pac-12 Freshman of the Year (2017); Pac-12 All-Freshman Team (2017); 2× Pac-12 tournament MOP (2018, 2020); NCAA season assists leader (2020); McDonald's All-American Game MVP (2016); MaxPreps National Player of the Year (2016); California Miss Basketball (2016)
- Stats at WNBA.com
- Stats at Basketball Reference
Medals
Women's basketball
Representing the United States
Olympic Games
Gold medal – first place	2024 Paris	Team
World Cup
Gold medal – first place	2022 Australia
FIBA Under-17 World Cup
Gold medal – first place	2014 Czech Republic	Team
FIBA Americas Under-16 Championship
Gold medal – first place	2013 Mexico	Team
Women's 3x3 basketball
Pan American Games
Gold medal – first place	2019 Lima	National 3x3 team

Sabrina Elaine Ionescu (/jəˈnɛskjuː/ yə-NESS-kew; born December 6, 1997) is an American professional basketball player for the New York Liberty of the Women's National Basketball Association (WNBA). She is widely considered one of the greatest three-point shooters in WNBA history.

Ionescu played college basketball for the Oregon Ducks, where she twice won the John R. Wooden Award, Wade Trophy, and the Naismith College Player of the Year earning consensus national player of the year honors as a senior. She led Oregon to its first Final Four appearance in her junior season. Ionescu set the Division I career triple-doubles record and is the Pac-12 Conference all-time leader in assists. She holds program all-time records in points, assists, and three-pointers.

Regarded as one of the greatest collegiate players in history, Ionescu was selected first overall by the New York Liberty in the 2020 WNBA draft. In 2023, she broke the WNBA single-season record in three-pointers and the WNBA Three-Point Contest record. She led the Liberty to their first league championship in the following year. Ionescu is a four-time WNBA All-Star and All-WNBA Team selection. She has won gold medals with the United States women's national basketball team at the 2024 Summer Olympics and the 2022 FIBA World Cup.

Off the court, Ionescu is among the highest-paid women's basketball players in the world due to several endorsement deals. She is the first female player to launch a unisex signature shoe with Nike, with her shoes being among the most-worn in the National Basketball Association (NBA), and is a part-owner of National Women's Soccer League (NWSL) team Bay FC. She gained global acclaim after competing against Stephen Curry in the first NBA vs. WNBA three-point contest at 2024 NBA All-Star Weekend.

== Early life ==
Ionescu was born in Walnut Creek, California, to Romanian-American parents. Her father, Dan Ionescu, escaped communist Romania around the time of the 1989 revolution, seeking political asylum in the United States. He hoped that his then-wife, Liliana Blaj, and their son Andrei could join them in a few months, but they were unable to move to the US until 1995. By that time, Dan owned a limousine service in Northern California, where he had chosen to settle because he had several extended family members in that area. Sabrina was around three years old when she first picked up a basketball. She has a twin brother Edward ("Eddy"), who was born 18 minutes after her. Sabrina Ionescu grew up in a Romanian-speaking household.

In a 2019 interview with Ava Wallace of The Washington Post, Ionescu admitted to being a "natural scorer", but said that most of the rest of her skill set came from playing alongside both boys and older girls in her childhood:

When I was younger, I was always playing with the guys, and I had to find ways to get the ball, because they never wanted to pass to me. So I figured that if I could rebound, I would be able to get the ball myself. Then passing-wise, when I was in sixth grade playing with the eighth-grade team, I was obviously a lot shorter, skinnier, smaller than they were. I would just have to find ways to impact the game other than shooting or scoring, and that was passing.

Ionescu attended a middle school that did not have enough players to field a girls' team, and her school refused to allow her to play on the boys' team. She recalled, "My middle school said I should be playing with dolls. Seriously, word-for-word." She responded by recruiting enough girls to enable her school to have a team.

== High school ==
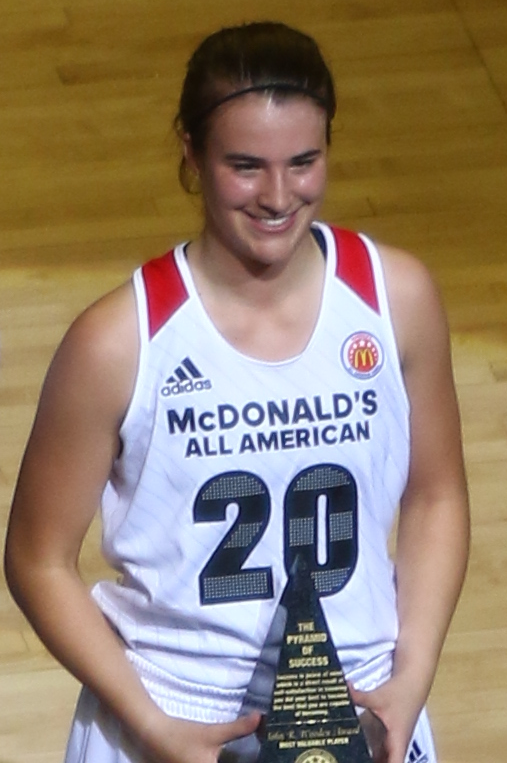
Sabrina Ionescu as MVP of the 2016 McDonald's All-American Girls Game

Ionescu was a four-year varsity basketball letter winner at Miramonte High School in Orinda, California under head coach Kelly Sopak.

As a freshman in 2012–13, she started 14 of 29 games and averaged 13.8 points, 3.9 assists and 3.9 steals per game to help her team to a 27–3 record and a Northern California Section Division II runner-up finish.

As a sophomore in 2013–14, Ionescu helped her team to a 30–2 record.

During her junior year, Ionescu averaged 18.7 points, 7.7 rebounds, 4.2 assists and 4.7 steals per game, and helped Miramonte High School to a 30–2 record with an appearance in the CIF open division semifinals.

In her senior year, she led Miramonte to the CIF open division title game after averaging 25.3 points, 8.8 assists, 7.6 rebounds, 4.5 steals and 1.3 blocks per game. She posted a triple-double in the championship game loss to Chaminade with 24 points, 10 assists and 10 rebounds. Ionescu also made a first half buzzer-beating shot from half court. She received national honors including the USA Today Girls Basketball Player of the Year, Max Preps Player of the Year, Cal-Hi Sports Ms. Basketball State Player of the Year and Gatorade State Player of the Year. Ionescu was named a McDonald's All-America and Jordan Brand All-American selection. She was named the McDonald's All-America game MVP after scoring a record 25 points, including seven three-pointers, with 10 rebounds.

Ionescu left Miramonte with a career win–loss record of 119–9 and a school-record 2,606 points scored. She is also the all-time leader in assists (769), steals (549) and triple-doubles (21). In addition to the career record, Ionescu also held the Miramonte top three single-season scoring records with 598 (2013–14), 760 (2014–15) and 834 (2015–16). Ionescu also held the single-game scoring record of 43 points vs. Pinewood High School while being double- and triple-teamed and the single-game record in assists with 19 at Dublin High School.

Ionescu was the No. 1 ranked point guard and No. 4 overall player in the recruiting class of 2016. According to Ava Wallace of The Washington Post, Ionescu chose Oregon "because she wanted to be the all-American at Oregon, not just an all-American somewhere else." At the time, she was the highest-ranked recruit ever to commit to Oregon basketball. However, she had difficulty making a college choice, not signing a National Letter of Intent with any school during either the early signing period in November 2015 or the late period in April 2016. Ionescu finally committed to Oregon just before the school's 2016 summer term began, driving with her father for 8 hours from their Bay Area home to Eugene, making an unannounced visit to Matthew Knight Arena and telling head coach Kelly Graves that she would join the team.

== College career ==
=== Freshman season ===
On November 13, 2016, Ionescu made her collegiate debut for Oregon, recording 11 points in an 84–67 win over Lamar. Ionescu recorded four triple-doubles, one shy of the Pac-12 record and two less than the NCAA record. She averaged 14.6 points, 6.6 rebounds and 5.5 assists per game, ranking second on the team in scoring and rebounding, and first in assists. She also posted seven double-doubles, ranked third in the Pac-12 and 29th in the NCAA with 183 assists on the year. Her 1.93-to-1 assist-to-turnover ratio was second-best in the Pac-12. She was named Pac-12 Freshman of Week four times and was named USBWA National Player of the Week. At the end of the regular season, she was named Pac-12 Freshmen of the Year and unanimous First Team All-Pac-12 and Pac-12 All-Freshman Team selection. Additionally, she was awarded the USBWA National Freshman of the Year presented by the United States Basketball Writers Association.

=== Sophomore season ===
Ionescu rose to national prominence in her sophomore year, leading the Ducks to their third regular-season league crown all-time and first-ever No. 1 seed in the Pac-12 Women's Basketball Tournament. She led the Pac-12 in scoring (19.2) and assists, dishing out 7.8 assists per game which was fifth-most in the country. She had 16 double-doubles this season and 14 20-point games. She recorded 10-assist games 13 times this season, handing out a league season-high 14 twice. On February 26, 2018, Ionescu was named ESPNW's college basketball player of the week. Following her second season, she was named the Pac-12 Conference Women's Basketball Player of the Year, and was also named a first team All-American by ESPN. Oregon also won the Pac-12 championship for the first time since 2000. She was named the winner of the Nancy Lieberman Award as the top Division I women's point guard after the season, and was also a finalist for the Naismith Award. Ionescu became the NCAA women's all-time leader in triple-doubles, trailing only former BYU men's player Kyle Collinsworth (with 12) among all NCAA players.

=== Junior season ===
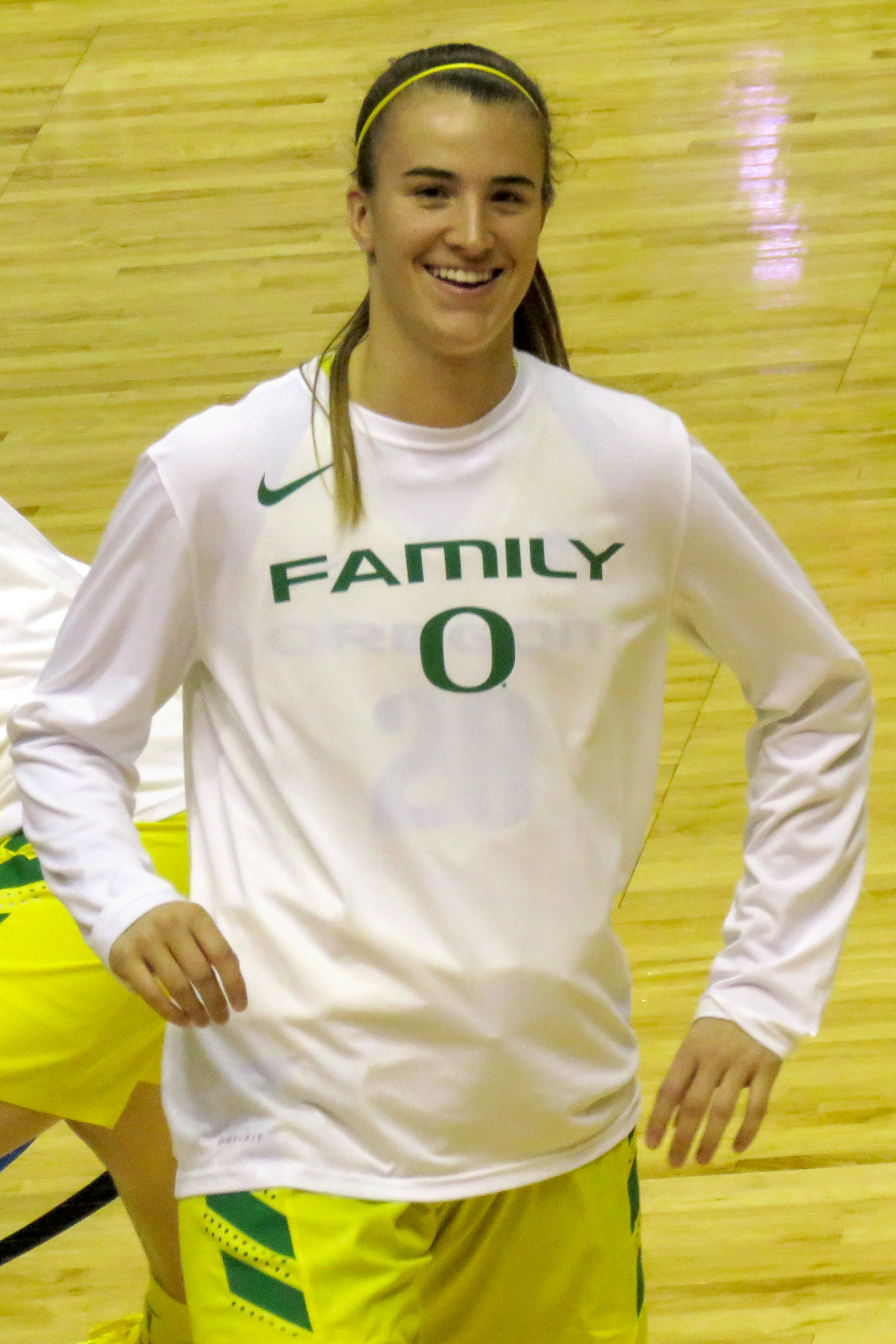
Sabrina Ionescu at the 2019 Pac-12 Tournament.

On November 6, 2018, Ionescu recorded her 11th triple-double in a victory against Alaska-Fairbanks. Twelve days later, she would tie the NCAA triple-double record, with her 12th triple-double in a win against Buffalo. On December 20, 2018, Ionescu recorded her 13th triple-double in a game against Air Force and broke the NCAA triple-double record for both men's and women's basketball. She was later named ESPNW Player of the Week. Since that game, Ionescu added five more triple-doubles for a season total of eighteen and broke the Oregon women's basketball assist record (formerly 608 assists) in a Pac-12 conference game against USC. In the 2019 NCAA Tournament, Ionescu led the Ducks to their first Final Four appearance after a 88–84 victory over Mississippi State. Ionescu finished the game with 31 points, eight assists, seven rebounds and a steal. In the Final Four, the Ducks lost to the eventual national champion Baylor 72–67. Ionescu won John R. Wooden Award and the Wade Trophy as the best women's college basketball player in NCAA Division I.

Despite having only played for three seasons, Ionescu was eligible for the 2019 WNBA draft by age. Additionally, she would receive her bachelor's degree that June. However, believing that she had "unfinished business" at Oregon, she chose to come back for her senior season. This announcement came shortly after Ionescu accepted a place in a newly launched one-year master's degree program in brand creation in Oregon's School of Journalism and Communications.

=== Senior season ===
In the second game of her senior season on November 13, 2019, Ionescu surpassed the 2,000 points, 800 assists mark for her college career with a 109–52 win over Utah State. She fell short of another triple-double with 16 points, 12 assists and 9 rebounds in the game but recorded her 2,012th career point and 810th career assist. In a win over then #3 Stanford (87–55), Ionescu scored a career high 37 points along with 11 rebounds and 7 assists, and broke Alison Lang's Oregon all-time career scoring record of 2,252 points in the third quarter. In the rivalry game against Oregon State on January 24, 2020, Ionescu had 24 points, 9 assists and 4 rebounds and broke Oregon State and NBA star Gary Payton's Pac-12 all-time record of 938 assists. Payton personally congratulated Ionescu on the achievement. On February 14, 2020, Ionescu recorded her 1,000th career assist in a game against #7 UCLA and joined Courtney Vandersloot as the only players in NCAA men's and women's basketball history with 2,000 plus points and 1,000 plus assists. Ten days later in the Ducks' 74–66 win at #4 Stanford, she became the first NCAA player ever with 2,000 points, 1,000 assists, and 1,000 rebounds in a career. Ionescu also recorded her eighth triple-double of the season, tying her own NCAA single-season record from the previous season. Earlier that day, she had been a featured speaker at the memorial service for Kobe Bryant, who had become a close personal friend within the previous two years, flying from Los Angeles to the Bay Area immediately after her speech.

On April 14, 2020, Ionescu was named the winner of the Honda Sports Award as the best collegiate female basketball player in the nation. Ionescu won the AP Player of the Year, Naismith College Player of the Year, USBWA National Player of the Year and the John R. Wooden Award and the Wade Trophy. Ionescu received the Nancy Lieberman award for her third straight season.

=== Impact at Oregon ===
According to Ducks coach Kelly Graves, in 2019 Ionescu had "a chance to be a Marcus Mariota, that level of player and an esteemed Oregon Duck when it's all said and done." He noted that attendance at Oregon women's games had dramatically increased during Ionescu's career at the school. In the season before she arrived, the average announced home attendance for the Ducks was 1,501. Her sophomore season saw an average attendance of over 4,200; it went up to over 7,100 in her junior season and over 10,000 in her senior season. Ionescu was also a significant draw when Oregon went on the road; for example, when the Ducks visited Washington during her junior season, the crowd for that game was 3,000 more than the Huskies drew two nights earlier against Oregon State.

Graves' remarks about Ionescu's future iconic status at Oregon proved to be prophetic. Shortly after the premature end of her senior season (caused by the COVID-19 pandemic), the university polled fans on social media, asking them to name the four Oregon alumni they would put on a national Mount Rushmore for the university. According to a 2020 story in the university's web journal Around the O, more than 70 suggestions were provided, but the four top choices were Mariota, Steve Prefontaine, Phil Knight, and Ionescu. As the story's author Damian Foley put it,

Yes, Sabrina Elaine Ionescu, who only earned her diploma in 2019, is considered by UO fans to be one of the four greatest Ducks ever, standing alongside such greats as Marcus Mariota, Steve Prefontaine, and the alumnus who co-founded Nike and made the Phil and Penny Knight Campus for Accelerating Scientific Impact possible.

== Professional career ==
=== WNBA ===
==== New York Liberty (2020–present) ====
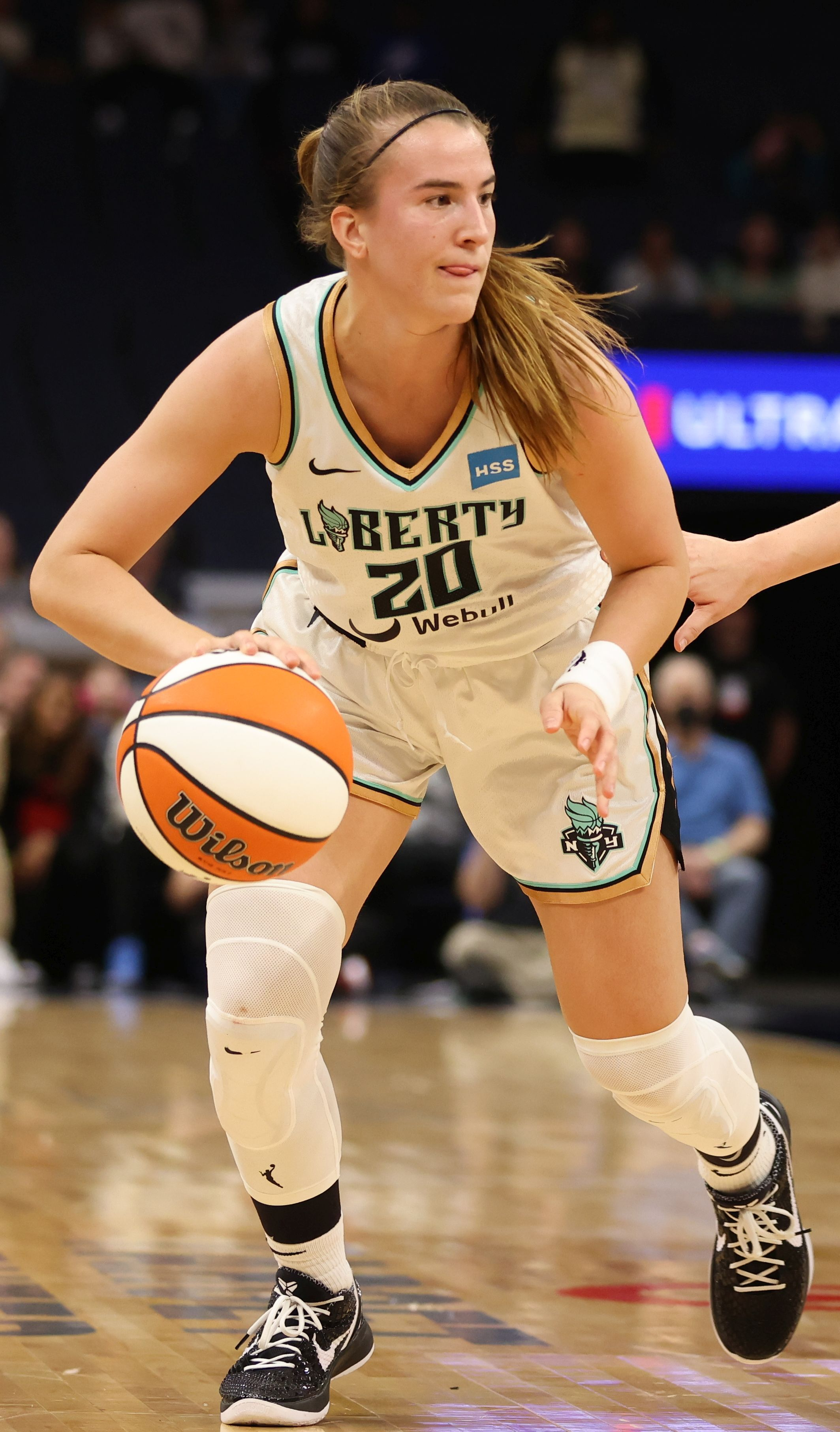
Ionescu with the New York Liberty in 2022

Ionescu turned 22 in December 2019, making her eligible to declare for the 2019 WNBA draft. A January 2019 mock draft by ESPN, incorporating input from WNBA personnel and ESPN women's basketball analysts, concluded that Ionescu was a possible top pick should she declare. However, Ionescu announced in an open letter published in The Players' Tribune on April 6, 2019, the day after Oregon's loss to Baylor in the Final Four and four days before the draft, that she would return to Oregon for her senior season.

On April 17, 2020, the New York Liberty selected Ionescu with the first overall pick in the 2020 WNBA draft. She played her first game with the Liberty on July 25. In her second WNBA game on July 29 against the Dallas Wings, she recorded 33 points, 7 assists, and 7 rebounds in 34 minutes of play.

On August 1, 2020, Ionescu injured her left ankle in the second quarter against the Atlanta Dream. She was diagnosed the next day with a grade 3 sprain, and was expected to miss about one month while recovering. In the end, though, she did not play again for the remainder of her first professional season. She complained about not being able to be considered a rookie in her second season of playing in the WNBA even though she played two games in her first season.

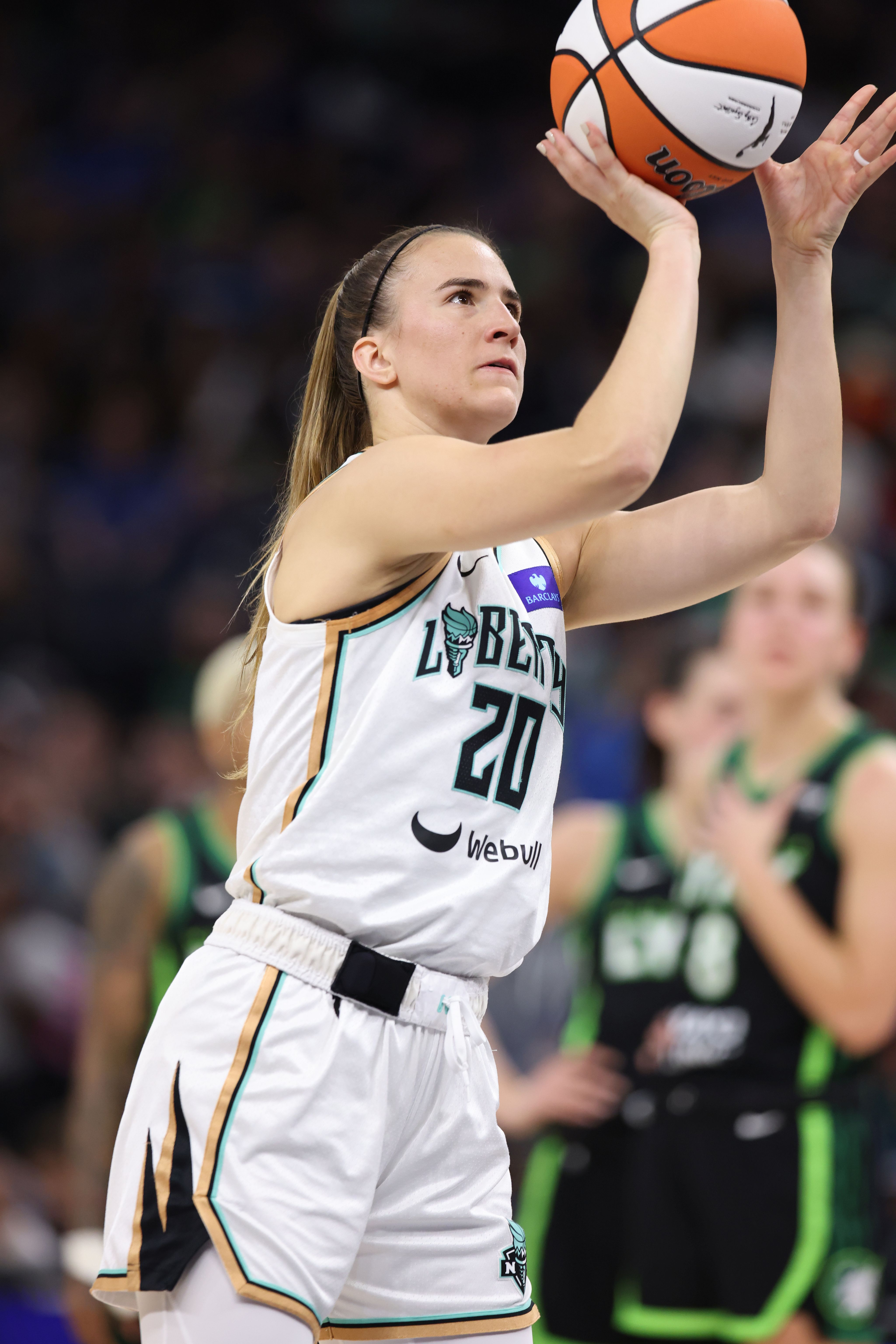
Ionescu in 2024

The next season, on May 18, 2021, Ionescu recorded her first professional triple-double in her 6th career game. She scored 26 points, 12 assists, and 10 rebounds, she became the fastest player in WNBA history to record a triple double. It was also the first Liberty triple-double, as well as the tenth in league history.

On July 6, 2022, Ionescu had 31 points, 13 rebounds and 10 assists to record the first 30-point triple-double in WNBA history.

Ionescu and the Liberty advanced to the WNBA Finals in consecutive seasons (2023 and 2024). They were defeated by the Las Vegas Aces in 2023, 3 games to 1. The following season, they matched up against the Minnesota Lynx. In game 3 against Minnesota, Ionescu scored the game-winning three-pointer to give the Liberty a 2–1 series lead. In the fifth game, she had a bad night shooting the ball, but she contributed leading Liberty with 8 assists and 7 rebounds, 6 of which were defensive, in addition to 2 steals and 1 block in the fifth game, helping the team win its first championship in the history of the franchise.

=== Unrivaled ===
==== Phantom BC (2025–present) ====
On December 23, 2024, Ionescu was announced as the final roster spot for the inaugural 2025 season of Unrivaled, the women’s 3-on-3 basketball league founded by Napheesa Collier and Breanna Stewart, signing a deal that "puts her in a category of her own" within the league. Ionescu signed with Phantom BC, joining her former college teammate, Satou Sabally, and filling the club's final wildcard spot.

== Three-point contests ==
On July 14, 2023, Ionescu scored 37 points in the Three-Point Contest, the highest in WNBA history, making 25 of her final 27 shots. Stephen Curry holds the NBA record of 31 points. The three-point contest is not a unified record between WNBA and NBA, as the shooting distance and ball sizes are not equal.

On February 17, 2024, Ionescu competed against Stephen Curry in a three-point contest during the NBA All-Star Weekend. She scored 26 against Curry's 29 points.

Ionescu was invited to participate in the 2024 contest, but declined the offer.

On July 16, 2025, the contestants for the 2025 three-point contest were announced, which included Ionescu. She went on to win the competition on July 18, hitting 11 shots in a row with a score of 30 in the final round. In the press conference afterwards, Ionescu said that prior to the competition she had promised rookie Sonia Citron half of her prize money if she won and that she would be keeping that promise. Ionescu stated the other half of her winnings would go to her SI20 Foundation.

== Off the court ==
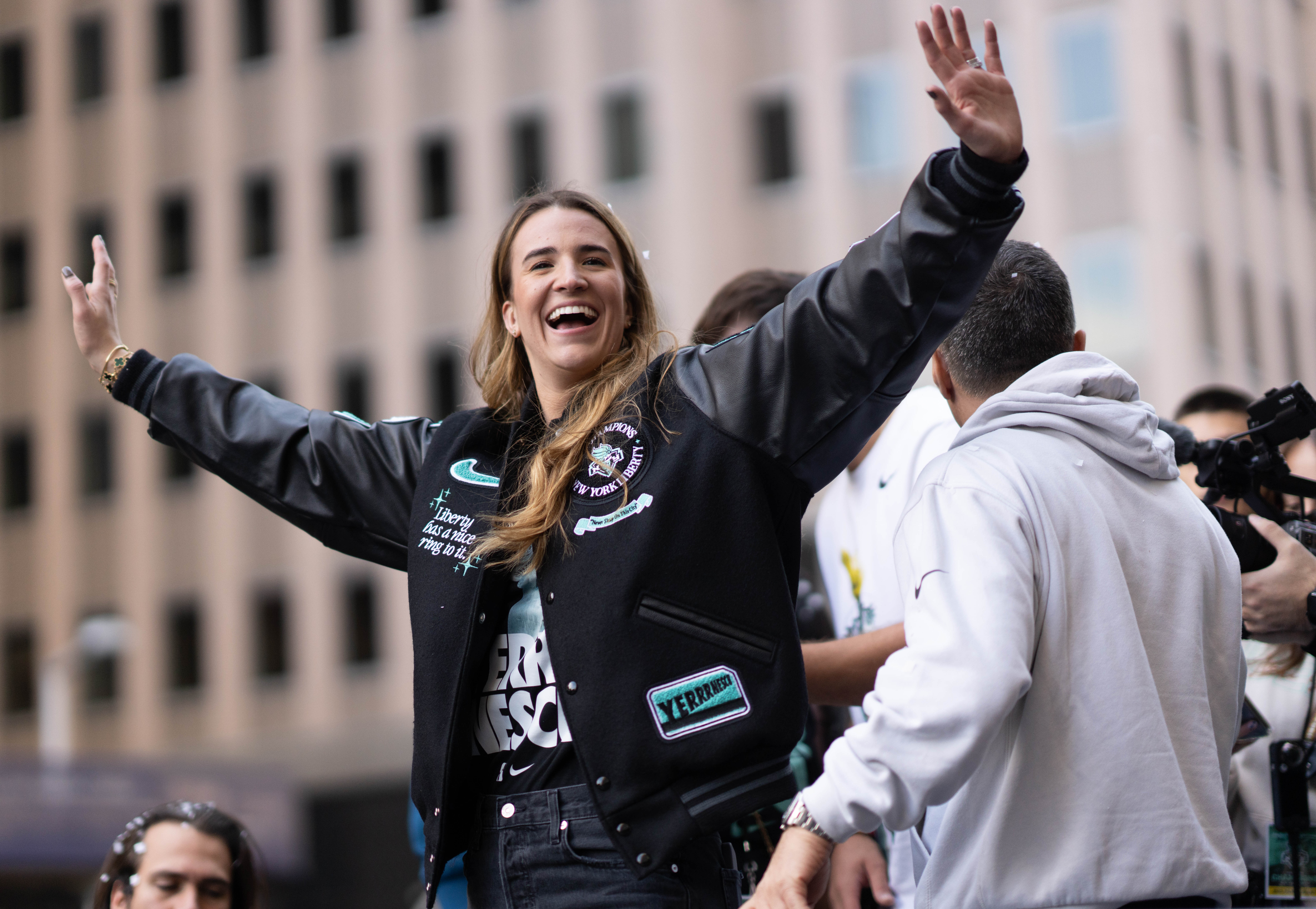
Ionescu at the New York Liberty championship parade in 2024

On April 17, 2020, Ionescu signed an endorsement deal with Nike, which will include signature footwear and apparel. On September 1, 2023, the Nike Sabrina 1's were released as her first signature shoe. On November 11, 2022, she rejoined her alma mater, Oregon, as the director of athletic culture. On November 14, 2022, she was ranked in the Forbes 30 Under 30 list for Sports.

Since 2022, Ionescu has hosted the Sabrina Ionescu Showcase for girls basketball teams in the Bay Area. Most recently these games have been hosted at all-girls high school Carondolet, where her former coach Kelly Sopak now coaches, and its brother school, De La Salle.

Her second signature shoe with Nike, the Sabrina 2, debuted in the summer of 2024.

In 2026, Ionescu would launch her own YouTube channel, becoming one of a few WNBA players to do so.

== National team career ==
=== 3x3 basketball ===
In late April 2018, Ionescu and Oregon teammates Erin Boley, Otiona Gildon, and Ruthy Hebard entered the USA Basketball women's national 3x3 championship tournament at the United States Olympic Training Center in Colorado Springs, Colorado. Ionescu had never before played under FIBA 3x3 rules, admitting after the tournament, "I had to ask the rules before the games started." She adjusted quickly to the unfamiliar format, leading her team to the championship while going unbeaten and also being named tournament MVP. Ionescu and her Oregon teammates would be named as the US team for the 2018 3x3 World Cup to be held in June in the Philippines. At the World Cup, they were the youngest team in the field, but swept their pool, defeating Cup holders Russia along the way. They finished 5th.

=== 2024 Summer Olympics ===
In June 2024, Ionescu was named to the US women's Olympic team to compete at the 2024 Summer Olympics in France alongside fellow New York Liberty teammate, Breanna Stewart. Ionescu and the United States defeated France 67–66 in the final, earning Ionescu her first Olympic gold medal and the United States’ eighth consecutive gold medal.

== Career statistics ==
Legend
GP	Games played	GS	Games started	MPG	Minutes per game	RPG	Rebounds per game
APG	Assists per game	SPG	Steals per game	BPG	Blocks per game	PPG	Points per game
TO	Turnovers per game	FG%	Field-goal percentage	3P%	3-point field-goal percentage	FT%	Free-throw percentage
**Bold**	Career best	°	League leader

†	Denotes season(s) in which Ionescu won a WNBA championship

=== WNBA ===
==== Regular season ====
WNBA regular season statistics
Year	Team	GP	GS	MPG	FG%	3P%	FT%	RPG	APG	SPG	BPG	TO	PPG
2020	New York	3	3	26.6	**.452**	.350	**1.000**	4.7	4.0	.7	.0	4.3	**18.3**
2021	New York	30	26	30.0	.375	.329	.911	5.7	6.1	.6	**.5**	3.2	11.7
2022	New York	36	36	**32.3**	.411	.333	.931	**7.1**	**6.3**	1.1	.3	3.0	17.4
2023	New York	36	36	31.5	.423	**.448**	.872	5.6	5.4	1.0	.3	**2.6**	17.0
2024^{†}	New York	**38**	**38**	32.1	.394	.332	.898	4.4	6.2	1.0	.3	2.7	18.2
2025	New York	**38**	**38**	31.4	.401	.299	.933°	4.9	5.7	**1.3**	.4	**2.6**	18.2
2026	New York	31	30	29.8	.388	.295	.896	3.8	4.7	.7	.3	2.8	14.6
**Career**	7 years, 1 team	212	207	31.2	.402	.343	.910	5.2	5.7	1.0	.4	2.8	16.4
**Career**	All-Star	4	2	21.0	.472	.438	1.000	4.3	6.0	.0	.0	1.0	13.5

==== Playoffs ====
WNBA playoff statistics
Year	Team	GP	GS	MPG	FG%	3P%	FT%	RPG	APG	SPG	BPG	TO	PPG
2021	New York	1	1	35.0	.417	.143	**1.000**	5.0	**11.0**°	1.0	.0	2.0	14.0
2022	New York	3	3	31.0	**.531**	**.400**	.750	**6.0**	4.3	1.0	.3	3.0	14.3
2023	New York	10	10	35.1	.393	**.400**	.913	4.2	4.7	.8	.7	**1.7**	13.7
2024^{†}	New York	**11**	**11**	**35.5**	.396	.363	.920	5.3	5.3	**1.6**	.5	2.9	**16.9**
2025	New York	3	3	35.3	.340	.219	.600	5.3	4.7	.3	**1.0**	3.3	15.7
2026	New York	5	5	33.8	.406	.390	.667	3.2	4.8	1.4	.0	2.8	16.0
**Career**	6 years, 1 team	33	33	34.7	.401	.355	.831	4.7	5.1	1.2	.5	2.5	15.4

=== College ===
NCAA statistics
Year	Team	GP	GS	MPG	FG%	3P%	FT%	RPG	APG	SPG	BPG	TO	PPG
2016–17	Oregon	33	33	32.9	.390	.420	.825	6.6	5.5	1.3	.2	2.9	14.6
2017–18	Oregon	**38**	**38**	35.6	.468	**.438**	.805	6.7	7.8	**1.7**	**.3**	3.0	19.7
2018–19	Oregon	**38**	**38**	**36.0**	.443	.429	.883	7.4	8.2	1.3	.2	**2.5**	**19.9**
2019–20	Oregon	33	33	33.7	**.518**	.392	**.921**	**8.6**	**9.1**	1.5	**.3**	3.0	17.5
**Career**		142	142	34.6	.455	.422	.851	7.3	7.7	1.5	.3	2.8	18.0

== Personal life ==
Ionescu is a Romanian Orthodox Christian. She was close with Kobe Bryant, with whom she had one-on-one training sessions, and spoke at the Kobe & Gianna Bryant Celebration of Life at the Staples Center on February 24, 2020. Ionescu is also a very close friend of her former teammate Ruthy Hebard.

On March 10, 2024, Ionescu married NFL center and former University of Oregon football player Hroniss Grasu, also a Romanian-American.

On December 15, 2025, Ionescu and her husband's California home was broken into.

== See also ==
- List of NCAA Division I basketball career triple-doubles leaders
- List of NCAA Division I women's basketball career assists leaders
- List of WNBA career 3-point scoring leaders
- List of WNBA career free throw percentage leaders
