= 1978–79 Oregon Ducks women's basketball team =

Intercollegiate basketball season

The 1978–79 Oregon Ducks women's basketball team represented the sixth official season for the University of Oregon's Varsity women's basketball program. The Ducks were coached by Elwin Heiny in his third year as head coach. The team finished the regular season undefeated and posted a 68–67 win over the internationally ranked No. 5 Republic of North Korea National team in a late-season exhibition game. Their final record was 23–2 with losses to Oregon State in the AIAW Region 9 championship tournament and South Carolina. The team led the league in points per game (84.6), boosted by the largest margin of victory in program history: a 121–40 win over the University of Hawaii.

== Notable players ==
This was the first college season that eventual-All-American and head coach Bev Smith played for the Ducks. Born in Canada (Salmon Arm, B.C.) and a member of the Canadian National Team, Smith averaged 15.2 points per game as forward and scored 381 total points during the season. She also averaged 12.9 rebounds per game and finished the season with 61 assists. She won multiple accolades in the U.S. and Canada for her performances during the '78–'79 season.

Sophomore Debbie Adams, also recruited to the University of Oregon for sprints and jumps on the track and field team, averaged 13.6 points per game.

Junior Julie Cushing averaged 15.6 points per game.

Freshman Claudia Eaton averaged 11.4 points per game.

== Oregon vs. South Korea ==
An exhibition game between the Ducks and the National South Korean team took place at McArthur Court on the University of Oregon campus on Wednesday, Feb 7, 1979. The game attracted 6,000 fans, which was the highest number of fans to date for the women's basketball program. The Ducks won 68–67.
