= Pac-12 Conference Women's Basketball Player of the Year =

Pac-12 Women's Basketball Player of the Year
- Awarded for: the most outstanding basketball player in the Pac-12 Conference
- Country: United States
- First award: 1987
- Currently held by: Cameron Brink, Stanford

The Pac-12 Conference Women's Basketball Player of the Year is a dormant basketball award given to the Pac-12 Conference's most outstanding player. The award was first given following the 1986–87 season, the first year in which the league then known as the Pacific-10 Conference (Pac-10) officially sponsored women's sports.

Two bodies voted for players of the year. The league's head coaches selected a winner since the award's inception, while media members who cover Pac-12 women's basketball presented their own version of the award in the 2009–10 season. As is the case with the corresponding men's award, coaches were not allowed to vote for their own players.

Ten players have won the award more than once, but only two, Candice Wiggins of Stanford and Sabrina Ionescu of Oregon, have won three times, and only Ionescu has won all three awards consecutively. Six players have won a major end-of-season national award in the year that they won the conference award. Four of them are from Stanford: Jennifer Azzi claimed the Naismith Award and Wade Trophy in 1990; Kate Starbird won the Naismith Award in 1997; Wiggins received the Wade Trophy in 2008; and Chiney Ogwumike won the Wooden Award in 2014. The others are Kelsey Plum of Washington, who won all three major awards in 2017, and Ionescu, who received the Wade Trophy and Wooden Award in 2019 and all three major awards in 2020.

There have been four shared awards. Starbird and Tanja Kostić of Oregon State tied for the coaches' award in 1996. In 2015, Reshanda Gray of California won the coaches' award and Ruth Hamblin of Oregon State won the media award. The following year, Jamie Weisner of Oregon State won the coaches' award outright and shared the media award with Jillian Alleyne of Oregon. Most recently, Stanford teammates Cameron Brink and Haley Jones shared honors in 2022, with Brink receiving the media award and Jones the coaches' award.

For most of the award's history, the list of honorees has been dominated by Stanford, which has had 12 players earn a total of 20 awards. The rest of the conference has had 17 players earn a total of 19 awards. However, Stanford's 2022 awards were the Cardinal's first since the 2013–14 season. Three of the then-Pac-12 members have never had a winner: established members Arizona State and Washington State, plus 2011 arrival Colorado.

The Pac-12 lost all but two of its members after the 2023–24 season, leading the remaining members, Oregon State and Washington State, to become affiliates of the West Coast Conference in most sports, including women's basketball, in 2024–25 and 2025–26. However, in a span of less than three weeks in September 2024, the Pac-12 added six new members effective in 2026–27—Boise State, Colorado State, Fresno State, Gonzaga, San Diego State, and Utah State. Several months later, Texas State was announced as a 2026 arrival. With nine confirmed members, conference play is expected to resume in 2026, with the award to again be presented starting in 2027.

== Key ==
†	Co-Players of the Year
*	Awarded a national player of the year award that same season: Wade Trophy (1977–78 to present); Naismith College Player of the Year (1982–83 to present); John R. Wooden Award (2003–04 to present)
C	Pac-12 coaches selection (2010–present)
M	Media selection (2010–present)
Player (X)	Denotes the number of times the player has been awarded the Pac-12 Player of the Year award at that point

== Winners ==
Season	Player	School	Position	Class	Reference
1986–87	Lauri Landerholm	Oregon	Guard	Senior	
1987–88	Cheri Nelson	USC			
1988–89	Jennifer Azzi	Stanford	Guard	Junior	
1989–90	Jennifer Azzi* (2)	Stanford	Guard	Senior	
1990–91	Sonja Henning	Stanford	Guard	Senior	
1991–92	Val Whiting	Stanford		Junior	
1992–93	Val Whiting (2)	Stanford		Senior	
1993–94	Natalie Williams	UCLA		Senior	
1994–95	Tanja Kostić	Oregon State	Forward	Junior	
1995–96^{†}	Tanja Kostić (2)	Oregon State	Forward	Senior	
1995–96^{†}	Kate Starbird	Stanford	Guard	Junior	
1996–97	Kate Starbird* (2)	Stanford	Guard	Senior	
1997–98	Adia Barnes	Arizona		Senior	
1998–99	Maylana Martin	UCLA		Junior	
1999–2000	Shaquala Williams	Oregon	Guard	Sophomore	
2000–01	Felicia Ragland	Oregon State	Guard	Junior	
2001–02	Nicole Powell	Stanford	Forward	Sophomore	
2002–03	Giuliana Mendiola	Washington	Guard	Junior	
2003–04	Nicole Powell (2)	Stanford	Forward	Senior	
2004–05	Candice Wiggins	Stanford	Guard	Freshman	
2005–06	Candice Wiggins (2)	Stanford	Guard	Sophomore	
2006–07	Devanei Hampton	California		Sophomore	
2007–08	Candice Wiggins* (3)	Stanford	Guard	Senior	
2008–09	Jayne Appel	Stanford		Junior	
2009–10	Nneka Ogwumike	Stanford	Forward	Sophomore	
2010–11	Jeanette Pohlen	Stanford	Guard	Senior	
2011–12	Nneka Ogwumike (2)	Stanford	Forward	Senior	
2012–13	Chiney Ogwumike	Stanford	Forward	Junior	
2013–14	Chiney Ogwumike* (2)	Stanford	Forward	Senior	
2014–15 ^{†}	Reshanda Gray^{C}	California	Forward	Senior	
2014–15 ^{†}	Ruth Hamblin^{M}	Oregon State	Center	Junior	
2015–16 ^{†}	Jillian Alleyne^{M}	Oregon	Forward	Senior	
2015–16 ^{†}	Jamie Weisner^{C, M}	Oregon State	Guard	Senior	
2016–17	Kelsey Plum*	Washington	Guard	Senior	
2017–18	Sabrina Ionescu	Oregon	Guard	Sophomore	
2018–19	Sabrina Ionescu* (2)	Oregon	Guard	Junior	
2019–20	Sabrina Ionescu* (3)	Oregon	Guard	Senior	
2020–21	Aari McDonald	Arizona	Guard	Senior	
2021–22 ^{†}	Cameron Brink^{M}	Stanford	Forward	Sophomore	
2021–22 ^{†}	Haley Jones^{C}	Stanford	Guard	Junior	
2022–23	Alissa Pili	Utah	Forward	Junior	
2023–24	Cameron Brink (2)	Stanford	Forward	Senior	

== Winners by school ==
School (year joined) (Note: For purposes of this table, the "year joined" reflects the year that each team joined the conference now known as the Pac-12 as currently chartered. Although the Pac-12 claims the Pacific Coast Conference (PCC), founded in 1915, as part of its own history, that conference disbanded in 1959 due to infighting and scandal. That same year, four PCC members established the Athletic Association of Western Universities (AAWU) under a new charter that functions to this day, with a fifth joining before AAWU competition started. The Player of the Year Award was not established until 1987, by which time the conference membership included all of the final members of the PCC except for Idaho, plus 1978 arrivals Arizona and Arizona State.)	Winners	Years
Stanford (1959)	21	1989, 1990, 1991, 1992, 1993, 1996^{†}, 1997, 2002, 2004, 2005, 2006, 2008, 2009, 2010, 2011, 2012, 2013, 2014, 2022 (×2)^{†}, 2024
Oregon (1964)	6	1987, 2000, 2016^{†}, 2018, 2019, 2020
Oregon State (1964)	5	1995, 1996^{†}, 2001, 2015^{†}, 2016^{†}
Arizona (1978)	2	1998, 2021
California (1959)	2	2007, 2015^{†}
UCLA (1959)	2	1994, 1999
Washington (1959)	2	2003, 2017
USC (1959)	1	1988
Utah (2011)	1	2023
Arizona State (1978)	0	—
Colorado (2011)	0	—
Washington State (1962)	0	—
