= Tanja Kostić =

American basketball player and coach

Personal information
- Born: November 10, 1972 (age 52); Solna, Sweden

Career information
- College: Oregon State (1992–1996)
- Position: Head coach

Career highlights
- Second-team All-American – AP (1996); 2x Pac-12 Player of the Year (1995, 1996); 4x All Pac-10 (1993–1996)
- Stats at Basketball Reference

Tanja Kostić (Serbian: Тања Костић, romanized: Tanja Kostić; born November 10, 1972) is a Swedish retired women's basketball player best known for playing with the Oregon State Beavers from 1993 to 1996. She won a EuroLeague Women in 1998 with CJM Bourges Basket.

== Early life ==
Kostic was born in Solna, Sweden, and was a member of the Swedish national team by age 19. She enrolled at Oregon State University (OSU) in the United States in 1992. Throughout her career at OSU, she recorded school records of 2,349 points scored and 1,001 rebounds in 111 career games. She is the only player in school history with 2,000 points and 1,000 rebounds. Kostić made 869 field goals, and set Oregon State and Pac-10 records for free throws attempted (903), free throws made (608), and set an OSU record for field goals attempted with 1,773. She is the second all-time leading career scorer in the Pac-10, and the sixth all-time leading career rebounder in the Pac-10.

== Honours ==
Kostić was a first-team All-Pac-10 team member all four years at Oregon State, making the All-Freshman Pac-10 first team in 1993. She made the All Pac-10 team four times from 1993 to 1996. She was a consensus All-American in 1996 on the second team, and was Pac-10 Player of the Year in both 1995 and 1996.

== Professional career ==
Kostić played for the Portland Power of the American Basketball League, as well as the Cleveland Rockers and Miami Sol of the Women's National Basketball Association. She played five games for the Rockers in 1998 and five games for the Sol in 2000.

== Career statistics ==
Legend
GP	Games played	GS	Games started	MPG	Minutes per game	RPG	Rebounds per game
APG	Assists per game	SPG	Steals per game	BPG	Blocks per game	PPG	Points per game
TO	Turnovers per game	FG%	Field-goal percentage	3P%	3-point field-goal percentage	FT%	Free-throw percentage
**Bold**	Career best	°	League leader

=== WNBA career statistics ===
==== Regular season ====
Year	Team	GP	GS	MPG	FG%	3P%	FT%	RPG	APG	SPG	BPG	TO	PPG
1998	Cleveland	5	0	6.0	**66.7**	0.0	50.0	0.4	0.4	0.0	0.0	**0.6**	1.0
2000	Miami	5	0	**9.2**	33.3	0.0	50.0	**1.0**	**0.8**	**0.4**	0.0	1.4	**1.4**
Career	2 years, 2 teams	10	0	7.6	41.7	0.0	50.0	0.7	0.6	0.2	0.0	1.0	1.2

=== College ===
Year	Team	GP	GS	MPG	FG%	3P%	FT%	RPG	APG	SPG	BPG	TO	PPG
1992–93	Oregon State	26	-	-	47.5	**100.0**	63.7	8.2	1.1	1.5	**0.5**	-	18.2
1993–94	Oregon State	28	-	-	50.8	0.0	69.5	9.4	**2.0**	1.8	**0.5**	-	20.6
1994–95	Oregon State	**29**	-	-	**52.6**	0.0	64.2	7.6	1.8	1.2	0.4	-	22.3
1995–96	Oregon State	28	-	-	45.5	50.0	**71.5**	**10.8**	1.3	**1.9**	0.2	-	**23.2**
**Career**		111	-	-	49.0	60.0	67.3	9.0	1.6	1.6	0.4	-	21.2
Statistics retrieved from Sports-Reference.

== Personal life ==
Her parents are Serbian. She is married to Lithuanian basketball star Rimantas Kaukėnas, with whom she has three daughters.

== See also ==
- List of Serbian WNBA players
