= Felicia Ragland =

American basketball player (born 1980)

Personal information
- Born: February 3, 1980 (age 46) Tulare, California, U.S.
- Listed height: 5 ft 9 in (1.75 m)
- Listed weight: 135 lb (61 kg)

Career information
- High school: Tulare Western (Tulare, California)
- College: Oregon State (1998–2002)
- WNBA draft: 2002: 2nd round, 28th overall pick
- Drafted by: Seattle Storm
- Position: Guard

Career history
- 2002: Seattle Storm
- 2003: Phoenix Mercury
- 2004–2005: Houston Comets

Career highlights
- Pac-10 Player of the Year (2001); All Pac-10 (2000–2002); Jersey retired by Oregon State
- Stats at Basketball Reference

Felicia Ragland (born February 3, 1980) is an American former professional basketball player who played four seasons in the WNBA.

== College ==
After playing for the Beavers for four years, Ragland ranked in the school's top-10 all-time in 14 different statistical categories. In 2001, she became the third Oregon State player to earn Pac-12 Conference Women's Basketball Player of the Year. She was the first women's basketball player to be drafted by the WNBA when she was picked in the 2002 WNBA draft.

== Career statistics ==
Legend
GP	Games played	GS	Games started	MPG	Minutes per game	RPG	Rebounds per game
APG	Assists per game	SPG	Steals per game	BPG	Blocks per game	PPG	Points per game
TO	Turnovers per game	FG%	Field-goal percentage	3P%	3-point field-goal percentage	FT%	Free-throw percentage
**Bold**	Career best	°	League leader

=== WNBA ===
==== Regular season ====
WNBA regular season statistics
Year	Team	GP	GS	MPG	FG%	3P%	FT%	RPG	APG	SPG	BPG	TO	PPG
2002	Seattle	31	3	13.9	**38.4**	**40.0**	82.1	1.5	0.7	**0.9**	0.0	0.9	**4.5**
2003	Phoenix	3	0	13.0	8.3	20.0	**100.0**	0.7	0.7	0.7	0.0	**1.0**	1.7
2004	Houston	**34**	**10**	**15.2**	36.7	38.8	84.6	**2.0**	**1.1**	0.7	**0.1**	0.9	3.5
2005	Houston	4	0	2.3	0.0	—	—	0.0	0.3	0.0	0.0	0.0	0.0
**Career**	4 years, 3 teams	72	13	13.8	36.0	38.5	83.7	1.6	0.9	0.8	0.1	0.9	3.7

==== Playoffs ====
WNBA playoff statistics
Year	Team	GP	GS	MPG	FG%	3P%	FT%	RPG	APG	SPG	BPG	TO	PPG
2002	Seattle	2	0	9.5	33.3	33.3	—	3.0	0.5	0.0	0.0	1.0	3.5
**Career**	1 year, 1 team	2	0	9.5	33.3	33.3	—	3.0	0.5	0.0	0.0	1.0	3.5

=== College ===
NCAA statistics
Year	Team	GP	Points	FG%	3P%	FT%	RPG	APG	SPG	BPG	PPG
1998–99	Oregon State	27	205	36.4	0.3	0.7	4.7	1.8	1.5	0.1	7.6
1999–00	Oregon State	30	388	37.3	26.7	74.7	6.2	**2.9**	2.1	**0.3**	12.9
2000–01	Oregon State	29	572	**44.4**	**46.3**	75.2	**7.4**	1.9	**2.6**	0.2	19.7
2001–02	Oregon State	**32**	**638**	39.4	34.7	**82.8**	6.6	2.3	2.5	0.1	**19.9**
**Career**		118	1803	39.9	35.8	76.6	6.3	2.2	2.2	0.2	15.3

== Honors and awards ==
- Two-time honorable mention Associated Press
- Two-time Kodak District 8 All-American
- Three-time Pacific-10 Conference first team pick
- 2001 Pac-10 Player of the Year
- Jersey retired at Oregon State
