= Erin Boley =

American basketball player

Personal information
- Born: Hodgenville, Kentucky
- Listed height: 6 ft 2 in (1.88 m)

Career information
- High school: Elizabethtown (Elizabethtown, Kentucky)
- College: Notre Dame (2016–2017); Oregon (2018–2021)
- WNBA draft: 2021: undrafted
- Position: Forward

Career highlights
- Gatorade National Player of the Year (2016); McDonald's All-American (2016)
Medals
Women's 3x3 basketball
Representing the United States
FIBA 3x3 Under-18 World Cup
Silver medal – second place	2015 Hungary	Team

Erin Boley is an American women's basketball player with the Oregon Ducks women's basketball team at the University of Oregon.

== Career ==
In 2016, while a student-athlete at Elizabethtown High School, she was named the Gatorade High School Basketball Player of the Year. Boley began her career at Notre Dame as a freshman, in 2016. She then transferred to Oregon the following year for the 2017–2018 season but had to sit out a year due to transfer rules.

== Notre Dame and Oregon statistics ==
Legend
GP	Games played	GS	Games started	MPG	Minutes per game
FG%	Field goal percentage	3P%	3-point field goal percentage	FT%	Free throw percentage
RPG	Rebounds per game	APG	Assists per game	SPG	Steals per game
BPG	Blocks per game	PPG	Points per game	**Bold**	Career high

Year	Team	GP	Points	FG%	3P%	FT%	RPG	APG	SPG	BPG	PPG
2016-17	Notre Dame	37	239	42.2%	39.5%	88.9%	2.8	0.6	0.5	-	6.5
2017-18	Oregon	Did not play due to NCAA transfer rules									
2018-19	Oregon	**38**	**472**	45.5%	43.0%	**94.7%**	3.5	**1.1**	0.5	0.1	**12.4**
2019-20	Oregon	33	303	45.0%	**44.1%**	75.0%	2.0	0.7	0.8	0.1	9.2
2020-21	Oregon	23	250	**47.1%**	40.2%	79.2%	**4.9**	0.8	**1.0**	**0.1**	10.9
Career		131	1264	45.1%	42.3%	85.4%	3.2	0.8	0.6	0.1	9.6
