= Ruth Davis (basketball) =

Canadian basketball player (born 1994)

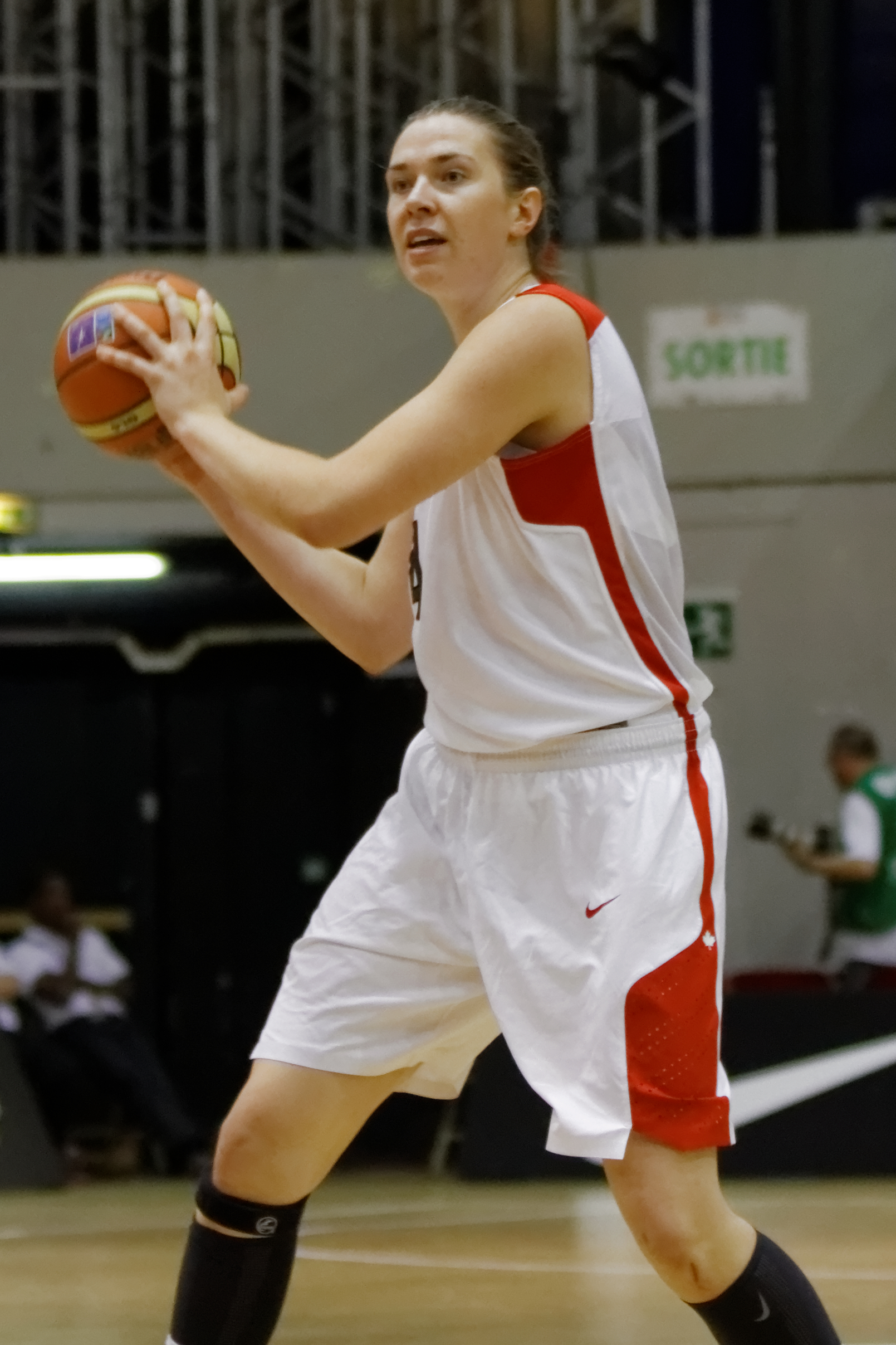
- Davis in June 2013

Personal information
- Born: June 24, 1994 (age 32) Smithers, British Columbia, Canada
- Listed height: 6 ft 6 in (1.98 m)
- Listed weight: 227 lb (103 kg)

Career information
- High school: Houston Christian School (Houston, British Columbia)
- College: Oregon State (2012–2016)
- WNBA draft: 2016: 2nd round, 18th overall pick
- Drafted by: Dallas Wings
- Playing career: 2016–present
- Position: Center

Career history
- 2016: Dallas Wings
- 2016–2017: Perth Lynx
- 2017–2018: Adelaide Lightning
- 2018: Tango Bourges Basket
- 2018: BC Castors Braine
- 2019–2020: WBC Dynamo Novosibirsk
- 2020–2021: DGT AZS Politechnika Gdanska
- 2021–2022: Olympiacos
- 2022: Lakeside Lightning
- 2022–2023: Barca CBS
- 2023–2024: Bendigo Spirit

Career highlights
- NBL1 West leading rebounder (2022); Third-team All-American – AP (2015); 3× First-team All-Pac-12 (2014–2016); 2× Pac-12 Defensive Player of the Year (2015, 2016); 3× Pac-12 All-Defensive Team (2014–2016); Pac-12 Scholar-Athlete of the Year (2016)
- Stats at WNBA.com
- Stats at Basketball Reference

Ruth Davis (née Hamblin; born June 24, 1994) is a Canadian former professional basketball player. She was drafted 18th overall by the Dallas Wings in the 2016 WNBA draft. Born in Smithers, British Columbia, she played college basketball for Oregon State.

== High school career ==
Davis attended Houston Christian School in Houston, British Columbia, where she played basketball for coach Wendall Ewald. As a senior in 2011–12, she averaged 27 points, 13 rebounds and 11 blocks per game. Over her junior and senior years, she led the team to a combined 61–2 record and won back-to-back British Columbia Senior Girls 'A' Basketball Championships.

== College career ==
As a freshman at Oregon State in 2012–13, Davis played in 28 games and averaged 4.4 points, 2.9 rebounds and 1.1 blocks in 13 minutes per game. She recorded 32 blocks on the season, which was ranked second on the team and the third-most in Oregon State freshman history.

As a sophomore in 2013–14, Davis started all 35 games and averaged 9.5 points, 8.5 rebounds and 4.0 blocks per game. She set a school and Pac-12 single-season record with 141 blocks, tied for the 19th highest total in NCAA history. She also produced the first triple-double at Oregon State in 30 years on January 13 against Oregon with totals of 23 points, 12 rebounds and a school-record 10 blocks. At the season's end, she earned Pac-12 All-Defensive Team, All-Pac-12 Honorable Mention, first-team All-Pac-12 and Pac-12 All-Defensive Team honors.

As a junior in 2014–15, Davis averaged 12.9 points and 8.6 rebounds per game, while leading the team with 122 blocks. Her 122 blocks was the second-highest single-season total in OSU history. She was subsequently named Pac-12 Player of the Year (media), Pac-12 Defensive Player of the Year (media and coaches) and All-Pac-12 (media and coaches).

As a senior in 2015–16, Davis averaged 11.8 points and 10.0 rebounds per game, while starting all 37 games. She blocked 130 shots on the season to set the Pac-12 record for career blocks (425). She also set the Oregon State single-season record for rebounds with 370, thus setting the OSU career rebounding record with 1,027. At the season's end, she earned Pac-12 Scholar-Athlete of the Year, Pac-12 Defensive Player of the Year and first-team All-Pac-12.

== Career statistics ==
Legend
GP	Games played	GS	Games started	MPG	Minutes per game	RPG	Rebounds per game
APG	Assists per game	SPG	Steals per game	BPG	Blocks per game	PPG	Points per game
TO	Turnovers per game	FG%	Field-goal percentage	3P%	3-point field-goal percentage	FT%	Free-throw percentage
**Bold**	Career best	°	League leader

=== WNBA ===
==== Regular season ====
WNBA regular season statistics
Year	Team	GP	GS	MPG	FG%	3P%	FT%	RPG	APG	SPG	BPG	TO	PPG
2016	Dallas	20	0	6.5	25.0	0.0	71.4	1.5	0.2	0.1	0.5	0.2	1.1
**Career**	1 year, 1 team	20	0	6.5	25.0	0.0	71.4	1.5	0.2	0.1	0.5	0.2	1.1

=== College ===
NCAA statistics
Year	Team	GP	GS	MPG	FG%	3P%	FT%	RPG	APG	SPG	BPG	PPG
2012–13	Oregon State	28	0	13.0	.500	.000	.439	2.9	.0	.3	1.1	4.4
2013–14	Oregon State	35	35	26.7	.571	.000	.505	8.5	.4	.1	**4.0**	9.5
2014–15	Oregon State	32	32	26.6	**.580**	.000	**.725**	8.6	**.8**	**.4**	3.8	**12.9**
2015–16	Oregon State	**37**	**37**	**27.5**	.551	.000	.625	**10.0**	.5	**.4**	3.5	11.8
**Career**		132	104	24.0	.560	.000	.586	7.8	.5	.3	3.2	9.9

== Professional career ==
On April 14, 2016, Davis was selected in the second round of the 2016 WNBA draft with the 18th overall pick by the Dallas Wings. Exactly one month later, she made her WNBA debut in a 90–79 win over the Indiana Fever. She recorded three rebounds in just over two minutes of action, and scored one point on 1-of-2 shooting from the free throw line.

On June 9, 2016, Davis signed with the Perth Lynx for the 2016–17 WNBL season. On January 7, 2017, she had a season-best game with 21 points, eight rebounds, five blocks, three steals and three assists in a 108–67 win over the Bendigo Spirit.

On May 17, 2017, Davis signed with the Adelaide Lightning for the 2017–18 WNBL season.

In January 2018, Davis moved to France to finish the season with Tango Bourges Basket.

Davis started the 2018–19 season in Belgium with BC Castors Braine, but left in December 2018. She played the 2019–20 season in Russia with WBC Dynamo Novosibirsk, the 2020–21 season in Poland with DGT AZS Politechnika Gdanska, and the 2021–22 season in Greece with Olympiacos.

In April 2022, Davis signed with the Lakeside Lightning for the 2022 NBL1 West season.

For the 2022–23 season, Davis joined Barca CBS of the Spanish LF Endesa.

Davis played for the Bendigo Spirit in the 2023–24 WNBL season.

== National team career ==
In 2012, Davis represented Canada for the first time at the FIBA Americas U18 Championship for Women. Over four games, she averaged 3.8 points and 1.2 rebounds per game. She was promoted to the Canadian senior national team in the summer of 2013 for exhibitions in Europe and China.

Davis appeared for the Canadian senior national team at the Edmonton Grads International Classic, a three-game series against Brazil in June 2014.
