= Jillian Alleyne =

American basketball player (born 1994)

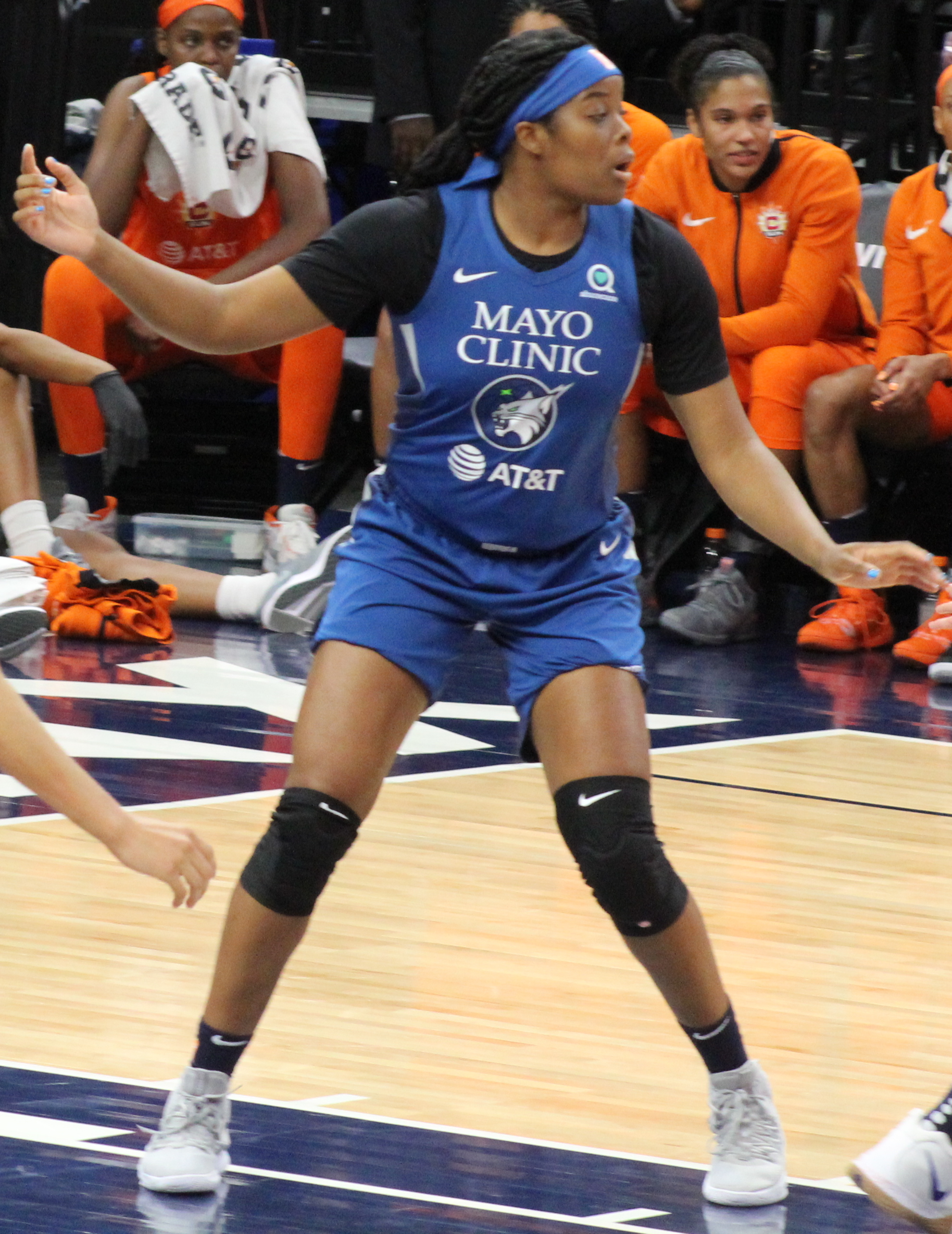
- Alleyne with the Minnesota Lynx in 2019

No. 14 – Tarsus Belediyesi Basketball
- Position: Center
- League: Turkish Super League

Personal information
- Born: September 8, 1994 (age 32) Fontana, California, U.S.
- Listed height: 6 ft 3 in (1.91 m)
- Listed weight: 188 lb (85 kg)

Career information
- High school: Summit (Fontana, California)
- College: Oregon (2012–2016)
- WNBA draft: 2016: 2nd round, 20th overall pick
- Drafted by: Phoenix Mercury
- Playing career: 2017–present

Career history
- 2018–2019: IDK Gipuzkoa
- 2018–2019: Hapoel Rishon LeZion
- 2019: Minnesota Lynx
- 2019–2020: Elitzur Ramla
- 2021: Washington Mystics
- 2022–2023: Maccabi Ramat Gan
- 2023: Elitzur Ramla
- 2023–2024: Panathinaikos
- 2024-: Tarsus Belediyesi Basketball

Career highlights
- 2× Third-team All-American – AP (2015, 2016); Pac-12 Co-Player of the Year (2016); 2× Pac-12 All-Defensive Team (2015, 2016); 3× All-Pac-12 (2014–2016); Pac-12 All-Freshman Team (2013); NCAA season rebounding leader (2014)
- Stats at Basketball Reference

Jillian Chantel Alleyne (born September 8, 1994) is an American professional basketball player for the Tarsus Belediyesi Basketball of the Turkish Super League.

== Early life ==
Alleyne graduated from Summit High School in Fontana, California, in 2012. She was a McDonald's All-American nominee, named Sunkist League MVP, an all-state selection, and Inland Valley Player of the Year.

== College career ==
She recorded 21 consecutive double-doubles in an NCAA game, the third most in NCAA women's basketball history. She averaged 19.6 points per game and 16.3 rebounds per game during the 21 games.

Alleyne shared the media version of the Pac-12 Player of the Year award in 2016 with Oregon State's Jamie Weisner, who had also won the Pac-12 coaches' version of the award.

She led among Division I teams with 16.2 rebounds per game in her sophomore year 2013–14. The following year she was second, averaging 15.2 rebounds per game and in her senior year she was also second in the nation, averaging 13.6 rebounds per game. In each of her last three years, she was the nation's leader, among Division I players, in offensive rebounds per game. In 2014–15 she was the US leader in double doubles (double digit scoring and double digit rebounds). She recorded a double double in 29 games.

For her college career, she has the third most rebounds and the second most double doubles in NCAA Division I history.

== Oregon statistics ==
Legend
GP	Games played	GS	Games started	MPG	Minutes per game	FG%	Field goal percentage	3P%	3-point field goal percentage
FT%	Free throw percentage	RPG	Rebounds per game	APG	Assists per game	SPG	Steals per game	BPG	Blocks per game
TO	Turnovers per game	PPG	Points per game	**Bold**	Career high	*	Led Division I

Year	Team	GP	Points	FG%	3P%	FT%	RPG	APG	SPG	BPG	PPG
2012-13	Oregon	31	402	45.1	-	53.8	11.9	1.0	0.9	1.3	13.0
2013-14	Oregon	**32**	**684**	55.4	-	**70.9**	***16.2**	2.0	**1.6**	1.1	**21.4**
2014-15	Oregon	30	551	57.6	**50.0**	56.4	15.2	1.2	0.8	**1.4**	18.4
2015-16	Oregon	27	514	**58.5**	-	60.7	13.6	**2.0**	1.4	1.1	19.0
Career	Oregon	120	2151	54.3	20.0	61.7	14.3	1.5	1.2	1.2	17.9

== WNBA career statistics ==
Legend
GP	Games played	GS	Games started	MPG	Minutes per game	RPG	Rebounds per game
APG	Assists per game	SPG	Steals per game	BPG	Blocks per game	PPG	Points per game
TO	Turnovers per game	FG%	Field-goal percentage	3P%	3-point field-goal percentage	FT%	Free-throw percentage
**Bold**	Career best	°	League leader

=== Regular season ===
Year	Team	GP	GS	MPG	FG%	3P%	FT%	RPG	APG	SPG	BPG	TO	PPG
2019	Minnesota	**5**	0	2.8	**.333**	.000	.000	1.0	**0.2**	0.0	**0.2**	0.0	**0.8**
2021	Washington	2	0	**4.0**	.000	.000	.000	**2.0**	0.0	**0.5**	0.0	0.0	0.0
Career	2 years, 2 teams	7	0	3.1	.250	.000	.000	1.3	0.1	0.1	0.1	0.0	0.6

== Club honors ==
=== Panathinaikos ===
- 1× Greek Cup Winner: 2024

== Personal life ==
Along with other members from the Ducks basketball team, she has done charity work in the Dominican Republic. In college, she is majored in communication disorders and sciences.
