= Oregon Ducks women's basketball =

Oregon Ducks
2025–26 Oregon Ducks women's basketball team
- University: University of Oregon
- Head coach: Kelly Graves (12th season)
- Location: Eugene, Oregon
- Arena: Matthew Knight Arena (capacity: 12,364)
- Conference: Big Ten
- Nickname: Ducks
- Colors: Green and yellow
- Student section: Oregon Pit Crew

NCAA Division I tournament Final Four
- 2019
Other NCAA Division I tournament results
Elite Eight	2017, 2018, 2019
Sweet Sixteen	2017, 2018, 2019, 2021
Appearances	1982, 1984, 1987, 1994, 1995, 1996, 1997, 1998, 1999, 2000, 2001, 2005, 2017, 2018, 2019, 2021, 2022, 2025, 2026

AIAW tournament second round
- 1981

AIAW tournament appearances
- 1980, 1981

Conference tournament champions
- NorPac: 1982, 1984; Pac-12: 2018, 2020

Conference regular-season champions
- 1999, 2000, 2018, 2019, 2020

Uniforms
Home	Away	Alternate

The Oregon Ducks women's basketball team is the official women's basketball team of the University of Oregon in Eugene, Oregon. Basketball is one of 11 varsity women's sports at the University of Oregon. The team is a member of the Big Ten Conference and a Division I team in the National Collegiate Athletic Association. Matthew Knight Arena is the home venue for both women's and men's basketball and women's volleyball. Nike provides the official team uniforms for University of Oregon sports teams.

== History ==
Women's basketball (as a zoned, single-dribble game) at the University of Oregon started as a club in 1899, brought to Oregon by physical education instructor Alice Chapman, wife of University President Charles Chapman. With a women's intercollegiate game emerging at Willamette University, Oregon Agricultural College, Pacific University, and elsewhere, an effort was made during the 1902–03 academic year to organize a women's university team. This effort was waylaid by the Oregon faculty athletic committee early in January 1903, however, with the committee deeming it "not advisable" for the "young ladies' basketball team" to enter into intercollegiate games. Instead, it was hoped that two campus teams could be organized to keep competition on a local level.

The sport became an "interest group" in 1965. Intercollegiate games also began in 1965, and in 1966, the women's team entered the Northwest College Women's Sports Association (which would eventually become the AIAW Region 9 conference). The program became official in 1973, the year following the passage of Title IX, which required federally supported universities to offer equal opportunities in men's and women's athletics. They have an all-time record (as of the end of the 2015–16 season) of 706–507. They previously played in the Northwest Basketball League from 1977 to 1982 (47–5 all-time record) and the NorPac Conference from 1982 to 1986 (34–12 all-time record) before the Pacific-10 Conference, now known as the Pac-12 Conference, began sponsoring women's sports in 1986. The Ducks' current all-time conference record is 260–280. They won the Women's National Invitation Tournament in 1989 over San Diego State, 67–64; and in 2002, with a 54–52 win over Houston.

== Season-by-season results ==
Season	Coach	Record	Conference record
1973–74	Jane Spearing	3–8	n/a
1974–75	Nancy Mikleton	2–10	n/a
1975–76	Nancy Mikleton	5–15	n/a
1976–77	Elwin Heiny	11–6	n/a
1977–78	Elwin Heiny	19–5	8–4 (2nd)
1978–79	Elwin Heiny	23–2	11–0 (1st)
1979–80	Elwin Heiny	24–5	13–0 (1st)
1980–81	Elwin Heiny	25–7	11–1 (1st)
1981–82	Elwin Heiny	21–5	4–0 (1st)
1982–83	Elwin Heiny	15–14	8–4 (3rd)
1983–84	Elwin Heiny	23–7	10–1 (1st)
1984–85	Elwin Heiny	14–14	6–5 (3rd)
1985–86	Elwin Heiny	21–7	10–2 (T-1st)
1986–87	Elwin Heiny	23–7	14–4 (T-2nd)
1987–88	Elwin Heiny	16–12	9–9 (5th)
1988–89	Elwin Heiny	22–10	11–7 (3rd)
1989–90	Elwin Heiny	17–12	9–9 (T-4th)
1990–91	Elwin Heiny	13–15	6–12 (8th)
1991–92	Elwin Heiny	14–14	6–12 (7th)
1992–93	Elwin Heiny	9–18	3–15 (T-9th)
1993–94	Jody Runge	20–9	13–5 (3rd)
1994–95	Jody Runge	18–10	11–7 (4th)
1995–96	Jody Runge	18–11	10–8 (T-3rd)
1996–97	Jody Runge	22–7	14–4 (2nd)
1997–98	Jody Runge	17–10	13–5 (4th)
1998–99	Jody Runge	25–6	15–3 (T-1st)
1999–00	Jody Runge	23–8	14–4 (1st)
2000–01	Jody Runge	17–12	10–8 (4th)

Season	Coach	Overall	Conference	Standing	Postseason
Jane Spearing (Independent) (1973–1974)
Spearing:		3–8 (.273)			
Nancy Mikleto (Independent) (1974–1976)
Mikleto:		7–25 (.219)			
Elwin Heiny (Independent/Northwest Basketball League/NorPac/Pacific-10) (1976–1993)
Heiny:		310–160 (.660)	139–85 (.621)		
Jody Runge (Pacific-10) (1993–2001)
Runge:		160–73 (.687)	100–44 (.694)		
Bev Smith (Pacific-10) (2001–2009)
2001–02	Bev Smith	22–13	10–8	T-6th	WNIT Champion
2002–03	Bev Smith	12–16	8–10	T-5th	
2003–04	Bev Smith	14–15	6–12	8th	
2004–05	Bev Smith	21–10	12–6	T-2nd	NCAA Second Round
2005–06	Bev Smith	14–15	5–13	8th	
2006–07	Bev Smith	17–14	8–10	6th	WNIT Third Round
2007–08	Bev Smith	14–17	7–11	7th	
2008–09	Bev Smith	9–21	5–13	7th	
Smith:		123–121 (.504)	61–83 (.424)		
Paul Westhead (Pacific-10/Pac-12) (2009–2014)
2009–10	Paul Westhead	18–16	7–11	T-6th	WNIT Third Round
2010–11	Paul Westhead	13–17	4–14	9th	
2011–12	Paul Westhead	15–16	7–11	9th	
2012–13	Paul Westhead	4–27	2–16	12th	
2013–14	Paul Westhead	16–16	6–12	10th	WNIT Second Round
Westhead:		66–92 (.418)	26–64 (.289)		
Kelly Graves (Pac-12) (2014–2024)
2014–15	Kelly Graves	13–17	6–12	T-9th	
2015–16	Kelly Graves	24–11	9–9	6th	WNIT Semifinals
2016–17	Kelly Graves	23–14	8–10	6th	NCAA Elite Eight
2017–18	Kelly Graves	33–5	16–2	1st	NCAA Elite Eight
2018–19	Kelly Graves	31–5	16–2	1st	NCAA Final Four
2019–20	Kelly Graves	31–2	17–1	1st	Postseason cancelled due to the COVID-19 pandemic.
2020–21	Kelly Graves	15–9	10–7	4th	NCAA Sweet Sixteen
2021–22	Kelly Graves	20–12	11–6	2nd	NCAA First Round
2022–23	Kelly Graves	20–15	7–11	8th	WNIT Great Eight
2023–24	Kelly Graves	11–21	2–16	12th	
Kelly Graves (Big Ten) (2024–present)
2024–25	Kelly Graves	20–12	10–8	T-8th	NCAA Second Round
Graves:		221–100 (.688)	102–76 (.573)		
Total:		892–590 (.602)			
National champion Postseason invitational champion Conference regular season champion Conference regular season and conference tournament champion Division regular season champion Division regular season and conference tournament champion Conference tournament champion

== Individual accomplishments ==
=== Individual National Award winners ===
Players

- USBWA National Freshman of the Year

Sabrina Ionescu (2017)

- Katrina McClain Award

Ruthy Hebard (2018)
Ruthy Hebard (2020)

- Wade Trophy

Sabrina Ionescu (2019)
Sabrina Ionescu (2020)

- Nancy Lieberman Award

Sabrina Ionescu (2018)
Sabrina Ionescu (2019)
Sabrina Ionescu (2020)

- John R. Wooden Award

Sabrina Ionescu (2019)
Sabrina Ionescu (2020)

- AP Player of the Year

Sabrina Ionescu (2020)

- USBWA Player of the Year

Sabrina Ionescu (2020)

- Naismith Player of the Year

Sabrina Ionescu (2020)

- James E. Sullivan Award

Sabrina Ionescu (2019)

- Honda Sports Award

Sabrina Ionescu (2020)

- USBWA Player of the Year

Sabrina Ionescu (2020)

=== Individual Conference Award winners ===
- Pac-12 Player of the Year

Lauri Landerholm (1986–87)
Shaquala Williams (1999–00)
Jillian Alleyne (2015–16†)
Sabrina Ionescu (2017–18)
Sabrina Ionescu (2018–19)
Sabrina Ionescu (2019–20)

- Pac-12 Tournament Most Outstanding Player

Sabrina Ionescu (2018)
Sabrina Ionescu (2020)

- Pac-12 Coach of the Year

Kelly Graves (2018) (AP)
Kelly Graves (2019)

† Shared Award

== Postseason ==
=== NCAA tournament results ===
The Ducks have appeared in 19 NCAA tournaments. Their combined record is 19–19.

Year	Seed	Round	Opponent	Result
1982	#6	First Round	#3 Missouri	L 53–59
1984	#3	First Round	#6 San Diego State	L 63–70
1987	#10	First Round; Second Round	#7 Eastern Washington #2 Ohio State	**W** 75–56; L 62–76
1994	#6	Round of 64; Round of 32	#11 Santa Clara #3 Colorado	**W** 74–59; L 71–92
1995	#6	Round of 64	#11 Louisville	L 65–67
1996	#11	Round of 64	#6 Wisconsin	L 60–74
1997	#6	Round of 64; Round of 32	#11 San Diego State #3 Tennessee	**W** 79–62; L 59–76
1998	#12	Round of 64	#5 Rutgers	L 76–79
1999	#5	Round of 64; Round of 32	#12 Cincinnati #4 Iowa State	**W** 65–56; L 70–85
2000	#6	Round of 64	#11 UAB	L 79–80 OT
2001	#13	Round of 64	#4 Iowa	L 82–88
2005	#10	Round of 64; Round of 32	#7 TCU #2 Baylor	**W** 58–55; L 46–69
2017	#10	Round of 64; Round of 32; Sweet Sixteen; Elite Eight	#7 Temple #2 Duke #3 Maryland #1 Connecticut	**W** 71–70; **W** 74–65; **W** 77–63; L 52–90
2018	#2	Round of 64; Round of 32; Sweet Sixteen; Elite Eight	#15 Seattle #10 Minnesota #11 Central Michigan #1 Notre Dame	**W** 88–45; **W** 101–73; **W** 83–69; L 84–74
2019	#2	Round of 64; Round of 32; Sweet Sixteen; Elite Eight; Final Four	#15 Portland State #10 Indiana #6 South Dakota State #1 Mississippi State #1 Baylor	**W** 78–40; **W** 91–68; **W** 63–53; **W** 88–84; L 72–67
2021	#6	Round of 64; Round of 32; Sweet Sixteen	#11 South Dakota #3 Georgia #2 Louisville	**W** 67–47; **W** 57–50; L 60–42
2022	#5	Round of 64	#12 Belmont	L 70–73 OT
2025	#10	Round of 64; Round of 32	#7 Vanderbilt #2 Duke	**W** 77–73 OT; L 53–59
2026	#8	Round of 64; Round of 32	#9 Virginia Tech #1 Texas	**W** 70–60; L 58–100

=== Historical NCAA tournament seeding ===
Years →	'82	'84	'87	'94	'95	'96	'97	'98	'99	'00	'01	'05	'17	'18	'19	'20	'21	'22	'25	'26
**Seeds →**	6	3	10	6	6	11	6	12	5	6	13	10	10	2	2		6	5	10	8

- The 2020 NCAA Division I women's basketball tournament was canceled March 12, 2020 due to the COVID-19 pandemic in the United States.

Pac-10/12 tournament seeding

Years →	'02	'03	'04	'05	'06	'07	'08	'09	'10	'11	'12	'13	'14	'15	'16	'17	'18	'19	'20	'21	'22	'23
**Seeds→**	7	5	8	2	8	6	7	7	6	9	9	12	10	10	6	6	**1**	1	**1**	4	2	9

B1G Tournament Seeding

Years →	'25	'26
**Seeds→**	8	11

- **Bold** indicates tournament champion

== Coaching history ==
Jane Spearing coached the first official season for the Ducks in 1973–74. The team finished that season with a 3–8 losing record. The 1974–75 and 1975–76 seasons were coached by Nancy Mikleton and the team posted 2–10 and 5–15 records, respectively. Head coach Elwin Heiny took over the program in 1976 and remained coach until 1993. Heiny was the first full-time coach hired for women's basketball. In his first season as head coach, Heiny coached the team to its first winning record (11–6). Jody Runge took over as head coach in 1993 and coached until 2001. She coached the Ducks to NCAA tournament appearances during each of her eight seasons as coach. Runge also spoke out for equality in women's athletics. From 2001 to 2009, former Oregon Ducks All-American Bev Smith coached the team, posting an 83–69 overall record. Paul Westhead coached the Ducks from the 2009–10 season through the 2013–14 season. The current head coach is Kelly Graves, assisted by Associate Head Coach Mark Campbell, and Assistant Coaches Jodie Berry and Xavi López.

== Facilities ==
The early women's basketball clubs played in Gerlinger Hall on the University of Oregon campus, built in 1927 to serve as the women's gymnasium. Games eventually moved to McArthur Court (also called Mac Court and "The Pit") — one of the most renowned college athletic facilities of all time. Admission was first charged for women's games at Mac Court in 1978. The Ducks relocated when Matthew Knight Arena opened in 2011. In their first game in Matthew Knight, the women's team defeated Oregon State University in the "Civil War," 81–72.

== Statistical leaders ==
Current through Oregon's game against Oregon State on December 13, 2020. Players active in the 2020–21 season are in bold type.

=== Career leaders ===
Scoring
Rank	Player	Years	Points
1	Sabrina Ionescu	2016–20	2,562
2	Ruthy Hebard	2016–20	2,368
3	Alison Lang	1980–84	2,252
4	Jillian Alleyne	2012–16	2,151
5	Bev Smith	1978–82	2,063
6	Stefanie Kasperski	1986–90	1,956
7	Lauri Landerholm	1982–87	1,783
8	Amanda Johnson	2008–12	1,505
9	Arianne Boyer	1993–97	1,501
10	Shaquala Williams	1998–2002	1,478

Rebounds
Rank	Player	Years	Rebounds
1	Jillian Alleyne	2012–16	1,712
2	Bev Smith	1978–82	1,352
3	Ruthy Hebard	2016–20	1,299
4	Alison Lang	1980–84	1,151
5	Phillipina Kylei	2021-25	1,073
6	Sabrina Ionescu	2016–20	1,040
7	Stefanie Kasperski	1986–90	996
8	Amanda Johnson	2008–12	893
9	Debbie Sporcich	1990–94	868
10	Arianne Boyer	1993–97	850

Assists
Rank	Player	Years	Assists
1	Sabrina Ionescu	2016–20	1,091
2	Maite Cazorla	2015–19	691
3	Lauri Landerholm	1982–87	607
4	Bev Smith	1978–82	443
5	Missy Croshaw	1990–94	417
6	Jacquie Semeniuk	1986–90	408
7	Corrie Misuzawa	2003–05	389
8	Shaquala Williams	1998–2002	369
9	Kaela Chapdelaine	2004–08	362
10	Lisa Bowyer	1996–99	358

Steals
Rank	Player	Years	Steals
1	Bev Smith	1978–82	349
2	Lauri Landerholm	1982–87	290
3	Sabrina Ionescu	2016–20	207
4	Nia Jackson	2008–12	204
5	Maite Cazorla	2015–19	201
6	Julie Cushing	1977–80	200
7	Amanda Johnson	2008–12	195
8	Lisa Bowyer	1996–99	186
9	Jasmin Holliday	2009–12	183
10	Debbie Adams	1977–81	173

Blocks
Rank	Player	Years	Blocks
1	Alison Lang	1980–84	425
2	Stefanie Kasperski	1986–90	402
3	Jenny Mowe	1996–2001	222
4	Bev Smith	1978–82	193
5	Renae Fegent	1994–97	169
6	Jillian Alleyne	2012–16	147
7	Ruthy Hebard	2016–20	146
8	Phillipina Kyei	2021-25	138
9	Cathrine Kraayeveld	2000–05	132
10	Gabi Neumann	1984–87	111

Three-pointers
Rank	Player	Years	Threes
1	Sabrina Ionescu	2016–20	329
2	Lexi Bando	2014–18	283
3	Taylor Lilley	2007–10	270
4	**Erin Boley**	2018–2021	219
5	Maite Cazorla	2015–19	211
6	Missy Croshaw	1990–94	189
7	Brandi Davis	2002–06	186
8	Jamie Craighead	1998–2002	182
9	Satou Sabally	2017–20	180
10	Amanda Johnson	2008–12	168

Field goal percentage (Note: Qualification requirement: At least 4 attempts per game, plus at least two seasons at Oregon)
Rank	Player	Years	Percentage
1	Ruthy Hebard	2016–20	.651
2	Alison Lang	1980–84	.590
3	Jenny Mowe	1996–2001	.573
4	Stefanie Kasperski	1986–90	.563
5	Sara Wilson	1990–94	.554
6	Angelina Wolvert	1997–2001	.544
7	Jillian Alleyne	2012–16	.543
8	Debbie Sporcich	1990–94	.540
9	Gabi Neumann	1984–87	.534
10	Debbie Adams	1977–81	.534

Three-point percentage (Note: Qualification requirement: At least 1 attempt per game, plus at least two seasons at Oregon)
Rank	Player	Years	Percentage
1	Lexi Bando	2014–18	.457
2	Jennifer Boum	1987–91	.446
3	Michelle Eble	1987–90	.443
4	**Erin Boley**	2018–2021	.429
5	Sabrina Ionescu	2016–20	.422
6	**Taylor Chavez**	2018–2021	.414
7	Natasha O'Brien	1997–99	.407
8	Chelsea Wagner	2003–06	.395
9	Missy Croshaw	1990–94	.392
10	Victoria Kenyon	2008–11	.391

Free throw percentage (Note: Qualification requirement: At least 1.5 attempts per game, plus at least two seasons at Oregon)
Rank	Player	Years	Percentage
1	Micaela Cocks	2007–10	.859
2	Sabrina Ionescu	2016–20	.851
3	Shaquala Williams	1998–2002	.839
4	Carolyn Gaines	2003–07	.812
5	Lauri Landerholm	1982–87	.810
6	Ariel Thomas	2010–14	.809
7	Sonja Curtis	1996–99	.800
8	Maite Cazorla	2015–19	.790
9	Lexi Bando	2014–18	.789
10	Gabrielle Richards	2004–06	.786

=== Single-season leaders ===
Scoring
Rank	Player	Season	Points
1	Sabrina Ionescu	2018–19	755
2	Sabrina Ionescu	2017–18	748
3	Alison Lang	1982–83	693
4	Chrishae Rowe	2013–14	690
5	Jillian Alleyne	2013–14	684
6	Ruthy Hebard	2017–18	652
7	Stefanie Kasperski	1988–89	650
8	Bev Smith	1980–81	632
8	Satou Sabally	2018–19	632
10	Alison Lang	1983–84	609

Rebounds
Rank	Player	Season	Rebounds
1	Jillian Alleyne	2013–14	519
2	Jillian Alleyne	2014–15	455
3	Bev Smith	1980–81	376
3	Phillipina Kyei	2022–23	376
5	Jillian Alleyne	2012–13	370
6	Jillian Alleyne	2015–16	368
7	Bev Smith	1979–80	367
8	Ruthy Hebard	2018–19	335
9	Ruthy Hebard	2017–18	333
10	Bev Smith	1978–79	323

Assists
Rank	Player	Season	Assists
1	Sabrina Ionescu	2018–19	311
2	Sabrina Ionescu	2019–20	299
3	Sabrina Ionescu	2017–18	298
4	Corrie Misuzawa	2004–05	209
5	Maite Cazorla	2015–16	206
6	Jacquie Semeniuk	1988–89	190
7	Sabrina Ionescu	2016–17	189
8	Corrie Misuzawa	2003–04	180
9	Maite Cazorla	2017–18	179
10	Lauri Landerholm	1986–87	171

Steals
Rank	Player	Season	Steals
1	Bev Smith	1978–79	95
1	Bev Smith	1979–80	95
3	Bev Smith	1980–81	94
4	Suzanne Washington	1978–79	87
5	Vanessa Selden	1981–82	84
6	Suzanne Washington	1979–80	83
6	Nia Jackson	2009–10	83
8	Lauri Landerholm	1986–87	76
9	Lauri Landerholm	1986–87	73
10	Sally Crowe	1994–95	72
10	Allison Towriss	1980–81	72
10	Chrishae Rowe	2013–14	72

Blocks
Rank	Player	Season	Blocks
1	Alison Lang	1982–83	140
2	Stefanie Kasperski	1987–88	119
3	Stefanie Kasperski	1988–89	111
4	Alison Lang	1983–84	105
5	Alison Lang	1981–82	99
6	Stefanie Kasperski	1988–89	92
7	Kerry Clawson	1977–78	84
8	Alison Lang	1980–81	81
9	Stefanie Kasperski	1986–87	80
10	Renae Fegent	1995–96	74

Three-pointers
Rank	Player	Season	Threes
1	Taylor Lilley	2009–10	124
2	**Erin Boley**	2018–19	108
3	Sabrina Ionescu	2017–18	102
4	Sabrina Ionescu	2018–19	94
5	Katelyn Loper	2013–14	83
6	Jamie Craighead	2000–01	81
6	Chrishae Rowe	2013–14	81
6	Satou Sabally	2018–19	81
6	Te-Hina PaoPao	2022–2023	81
10	Lexi Bando	2017–18	80

Field goal percentage (Note: Qualification requirement: At least 4 made per game)
Rank	Player	Season	Percentage
1	Ruthy Hebard	2019–20	.685
2	Ruthy Hebard	2018–19	.670
3	Ruthy Hebard	2017–18	.660
4	Debbie Adams	1980–81	.614
5	Alison Lang	1982–83	.611
6	Stefanie Kasperski	1988–89	.606
7	Debbie Sporcich	1992–93	.602
8	Alison Lang	1981–82	.594
9	Sara Wilson	1993–94	.593
10	Ruthy Hebard	2016–17	.588

Three-point percentage (Note: Qualification requirement: At least 1 made per game)
Rank	Player	Season	Percentage
1	Taylor Lilley	2006–07	.506
2	Lexi Bando	2016–17	.475
3	**Taylor Chavez**	2019–20	.474
4	Michelle Eble	1988–89	.471
5	Missy Croshaw	1993–94	.458
6	Lexi Bando	2017–18	.457
7	Jennifer Boum	1990–91	.454
8	Lexi Bando	2015–16	.453
9	Lexi Petersen	2015–16	.447
10	Lexi Bando	2014–15	.440

Free throw percentage (Note: Qualification requirement: At least 2 made per game)
Rank	Player	Season	Percentage
1	Sabrina Ionescu	2019–20	.921
2	Gabrielle Richards	2005–06	.909
3	Shaquala Williams	2001–02	.908
4	Sabrina Ionescu	2018–19	.883
5	Devyn Galland	2012–13	.875
6	Micaela Cocks	2009–10	.865
7	Sally Crowe	1994–95	.864
8	Micaela Cocks	2008–09	.860
9	Ariel Thomas	2013–14	.840
10	Jessica Schutt	1993–94	.836

== Oregon women's basketball players in professional teams ==
Player	Year	Drafted team	Current team	Drafted
Nyara Sabally	2022	New York Liberty	New York Liberty	RD 1, 5th overall
Sabrina Ionescu	2020	New York Liberty	New York Liberty	RD 1, 1st overall
Satou Sabally	2020	Dallas Wings	Dallas Wings	RD 1, 2nd overall
Ruthy Hebard	2020	Chicago Sky	Chicago Sky	RD 1, 7th overall
Maite Cazorla	2019	Atlanta Dream	Perfumerías Avenida	RD 2, 23rd overall
Jillian Alleyne	2016	Phoenix Mercury	Minnesota Lynx	RD 2, 20th overall
Amanda Johnson	2012	Phoenix Mercury	Retired	RD 3, 33rd overall
Taylor Lilley	2010	Undrafted	Retired	–
Cathrine Kraayeveld	2005	San Antonio Silver Stars	Retired	RD 3, 27th overall
Shaquala Williams	2003	Cleveland Rockers	Retired	RD 3, 30th overall
Edniesha Curry	2002	Charlotte Sting	Retired	RD 3, 41st overall
Jenny Mowe	2001	Portland Fire	Retired	RD 2, 20th overall
Angelina Wolvert	2001	Cleveland Rockers	Retired	RD 3, 43rd overall
