= Alison Lang (basketball) =

Canadian basketball player (born 1961)

Personal information
- Born: 28 June 1961 (age 64) Saskatoon, Saskatchewan, Canada

Sport
- Sport: Basketball

Alison Lang (born 28 June 1961) is a Canadian basketball player. She won a bronze medal at the 1979 Pan American Games, and also competed in the women's tournament at the 1984 Summer Olympics. Until January 2020, she was the leading points scorer for the Oregon Ducks, with 2,252 points.
