= Jamie Scott (basketball) =

American-Canadian basketball player (born 1994)

Free agent
- Position: Guard

Personal information
- Born: August 9, 1994 (age 32) Spokane, Washington, U.S.
- Listed height: 5 ft 10 in (1.78 m)

Career information
- High school: Clarkston (Clarkston, Washington)
- College: Oregon State (2012–2016)
- WNBA draft: 2016: 2nd round, 17th overall pick
- Drafted by: Connecticut Sun
- Playing career: 2016–present

Career history
- 2016: Washington Mystics

Career highlights
- Second-team All-American – AP (2016); WBCA All-American (2016); Pac-12 Player of the Year (2016); Pac-12 Tournament MOP (2016); 2× All Pac-12 (2015, 2016); Pac-12 All-Freshman Team (2013)
- Stats at WNBA.com
- Stats at Basketball Reference

Jamie Scott (née Weisner) (born August 9, 1994) is an American/Canadian professional basketball player, previously playing for the Washington Mystics of the Women's National Basketball Association (WNBA). She was drafted 17th overall by the Connecticut Sun in the 2016 WNBA draft, but cut during the 2016 preseason and signed with the Mystics. Scott played seven games for Washington before being waived on August 24, 2016. Born in Spokane, Washington, she played college basketball for Oregon State. At Oregon State, she was Pac-12 Conference Player of the year following the 2015–16 season in which she led the team to its first Final Four appearance. Scott played on the Canadian national team during the 2018 World Cup.

== Career statistics ==
Legend
GP	Games played	GS	Games started	MPG	Minutes per game	RPG	Rebounds per game
APG	Assists per game	SPG	Steals per game	BPG	Blocks per game	PPG	Points per game
TO	Turnovers per game	FG%	Field-goal percentage	3P%	3-point field-goal percentage	FT%	Free-throw percentage
**Bold**	Career best	°	League leader

=== WNBA ===
==== Regular season ====
Year	Team	GP	GS	MPG	FG%	3P%	FT%	RPG	APG	SPG	BPG	TO	PPG
2016	Washington	7	0	3.6	44.4	50.0	100.0	0.4	0.3	0.0	0.0	0.4	1.7
Career	1 year, 1 team	7	0	3.6	44.4	50.0	100.0	0.4	0.3	0.0	0.0	0.4	1.7

=== College ===
Legend
GP	Games played	GS	Games started	MPG	Minutes per game
FG%	Field goal percentage	3P%	3-point field goal percentage	FT%	Free throw percentage
RPG	Rebounds per game	APG	Assists per game	SPG	Steals per game
BPG	Blocks per game	PPG	Points per game	**Bold**	Career high

Year	Team	GP	Points	FG%	3P%	FT%	RPG	APG	SPG	BPG	PPG
2012–13	Oregon State	31	389	40.8%	37.2%	80.8%	5.9	1.7	**1.2**	0.2	12.5
2013–14	Oregon State	26	326	39.4%	39.9%	84.3%	5.3	**2.2**	0.5	0.0	12.5
2014–15	Oregon State	32	439	**48.1%**	42.0%	79.1%	**6.2**	1.9	0.7	0.2	13.7
2015–16	Oregon State	**36**	**623**	47.9%	**44.3%**	**85.0%**	5.5	2.1	0.9	**0.4**	**17.3**
Career		125	1777	44.5%	41.1%	82.6%	5.7	2.0	0.8	0.2	14.2
