= Bev Smith =

Canadian basketball player and coach

Beverly Smith
Personal information
- Born: April 4, 1960 (age 66)

Career highlights
- 2x Kodak All-American (1981, 1982)
- Women's Basketball Hall of Fame

Beverly "Bev" Smith (born April 4, 1960) is a Canadian basketball player and coach.

Smith played college basketball at the Oregon Ducks, where she was named a Women's Basketball Coaches Association All-American in 1981 and 1982. Her 2004 team made the National Collegiate Athletic Association tournament, after finishing 2nd in the Pacific-10 Conference; that was her second 20-win season. Oregon defeated Texas Christian University to advance to the 2nd round. In 2016, Smith was named to the Pac-12 women's basketball all-century team.

Smith led Canada's national team to a medal in the 1999 Pan American Games. While playing at Oregon, the team had a record of 93–19. She held school records for points in a game (38), points in a season (632), points in a career (2,063), rebounds in a game (26), rebounds in a season (376), rebounds in a career (1,362), and assists in a career (443).

Smith played in Italian clubs Vicenza (1982-1985, 1989–1990) and Ferrara (1986-1988), winning three Italian championships and two European Cups.

She was the women's basketball program head coach at the Oregon Ducks from 2001 to 2009, having succeeded controversial coach Jody Runge. She posted a Pac-10 conference record of 61-83 and an overall record of 123-121 The 2002 team won the Women's National Invitation Tournament Championship. The 2005 team won a first-round game in the NCAA tournament. The 2007 team received a bye in the WNIT and won a second-round game.

Later she became the assistant coach for the Canadian Women's National Team and helped lead the team to back-to-back gold medals in 2015 at the Pan American Games in Toronto and the FIBA Americas in Edmonton, qualifying for the 2016 Olympic Games in Rio.

She is a member of the Canadian Basketball Hall of Fame. In 2004, Smith was elected to the Women's Basketball Hall of Fame, located in Knoxville, Tennessee.
