= Oregon State Beavers women's basketball =

American women's college basketball team

2026–27 Oregon State Beavers women's basketball team
- University: Oregon State University
- Head coach: Scott Rueck (17th season)
- Location: Corvallis, Oregon
- Arena: Gill Coliseum (capacity: 9,301)
- Conference: Pac-12
- Nickname: Beavers
- Colors: Orange and black
- Student section: Beaver Dam

NCAA Division I tournament Final Four
- 2016
Other NCAA Division I tournament results
Elite Eight	2016, 2018, 2024
Sweet Sixteen	1983, 2016, 2017, 2018, 2019, 2024
Appearances	1983, 1984, 1994, 1995, 1996, 2014, 2015, 2016, 2017, 2018, 2019, 2021, 2024, 2025

AIAW tournament appearances
- 1979, 1981

Conference tournament champions
- (Pac-12) 2016, (WCC) 2025

Conference regular-season champions
- (Pac-12) 2015, 2016, 2017

Uniforms
Home	Away	Alternate

The Oregon State Beavers women's basketball team is the official women's basketball team that is at Oregon State University in Corvallis, Oregon. They are one of nine varsity women's sports at Oregon State. They are a member of the Pac-12 Conference and in the National Collegiate Athletic Association (NCAA). The team's home venue is Gill Coliseum and their official school colors are orange and black. The Beavers have to date made 13 appearances in NCAA Tournaments, most recently in 2024 reaching the Elite Eight. The current head coach is Scott Rueck, assisted by Deven Hunter, Sydney Wiese, and Eric Ely.

== History ==
=== Origins (1897-1940) ===
A women's basketball team was established at Oregon Agricultural College during the academic year of 1897–98, with one game played in the spring of 1898 by the school squad in response to a challenge offered by the team of the Chemawa Indian Institute of Salem. The match, played April 29 in Salem at the Willamette University gym, was won by OAC by a score of 13 to 11. The OAC team included Inez Fuller, Fanny Getty, Dora Hodgin, Blanche Holden, Bessie Smith, and Leona "Nonie" Smith.

The debut OAC women's team of 1897–98.

The OAC women's basketball team was more formally organized by the 1899–1900 academic year, with Bessie Smith elected team president as well as a slate of officers, including a vice president, secretary, and treasurer. Scheduling was handled by the team manager, Mr. J.H. Gallagher.

1899–1900 team, champions of Oregon.

The 1899-1900 team was a powerhouse, annihilating neighboring Albany College by a score of 47–2 in one January 1900 game played at the OAC armory. A local paper noted of the game, "So perfect and rapid was the playing of the ladies of the OAC, that the visitors were bewildered, and gazed open-mouthed at the skill of their opponents." For their part, the Albany Herald attributed the drubbing to a very slippery floor, a larger-than-accustomed gymnasium, and a smaller-than-usual ball — in addition to the "long and hard practice of the OAC girls."

It would not be until the 1901–02 season that a formal men's basketball program would be established at the school. The women's basketball program continued to set the pace for the school, with the team going unbeaten into March and generating a $50 gate for the athletic fund for a single game against Chemawa. "The example they set OAC young men in athletics is worthy of emulation," the Corvallis Times opined.

=== Club sport (1940-1971) ===
From the 1940s through the 1970s, women's basketball existed as a club sport under Oregon State's Women's Recreation Association (WRA).

=== Varsity team (1972-present) ===
Title IX of the Education Amendments of 1972 provided that "No person in the United States shall, on the basis of sex, be excluded from participation in, be denied the benefits of, or be subjected to discrimination under any education program or activity receiving federal financial assistance." At the time of the passage of this legislation, Oregon State only maintained crew as an intercollegiate team sport for women, and that just since 1967. Facing sanctions in federal funding, OSU began women's intercollegiate sports programs in short order, including golf (1972), gymnastics (1972), swimming (1972), and softball (1975).

In 1976, two more sports for women were launched in the march towards parity — volleyball and a rebirth of the long dormant intercollegiate basketball program.

OSU's women's basketball team posted a 5–20 record in its inaugural 1976–77 season. By the end of the 2018–19 season, the team's overall record was 695–576.

Current Head Coach Scott Rueck has led the program to new heights in recent years, guiding the Beavers to the 2015, 2016, and 2017 Pac-12 Conference regular season titles, the 2016 Pac-12 Conference Tournament title, the 2025 WCC Conference Tournament title in the school's first season in the West Coast Conference, as well as nine NCAA tournament berths (2014, 2015, 2016, 2017, 2018, 2019, 2021, 2024, 2025), 3 Elite Eight finishes (2016, 2018, 2024), and a Final Four (2016).

In July 2026, players on the team filed a petition for union representation with the Oregon Employment Relations Board, the first women's college sports team to attempt unionization.

1908 Oregon Agricultural College Women's Basketball team photo

== Head coaches ==
Name	Years	Record
Lynn Guggenheim	1971-1976	
Mary Covington	1976–1978	15–30 (.333)
Aki Hill	1978–1995	274–206 (.571)
Judy Spoelstra	1995–2005	133–158 (.457)
LaVonda Wagner	2005–2010	68–85 (.444)
Scott Rueck	2010–present	297–154 (.659)

Current head coach Scott Rueck is under contract through the 2026–2027 season after signing a four-year extension on October 17, 2017. He has been head coach since 2010, previously serving as head coach at George Fox University for 14 years. Rueck is a graduate of Oregon State, earning a bachelor's degree in exercise and sports science from the university in 1991 and a master's degree in physical education in 1992.

=== Notable alumni ===
- Mikayla Pivec - 2019 third-round draft selection of the Atlanta Dream
- Marie Gulich - 2018 first-round draft selection of the Phoenix Mercury
- Ruth Hamblin - 2016 second round by the Dallas Wings
- Carol Menken — 1984 Olympics gold medalist, member Oregon Sports Hall of Fame
- Jamie Weisner - 2016 second round by the Connecticut Sun
- Sydney Weise - 2017 first-round draft selection of the Los Angeles Sparks

== Awards ==
Since 2014:

- Pac-12 Coach of the Year - Scott Rueck (2017), (2024)
- Pac-12 Player of the Year - Jamie Weisner (2016), Ruth Hamblin (2015)
- Pac-12 Scholar Athlete of the Year - Mikayla Pivec (2020), Sydney Wiese (2017), Ruth Hamblin (2016)
- Pac-12 Defensive Players of the Year - Marie Gülich (2018), Gabriella Hanson (2017), Ruth Hamblin (2015, 2016),
- Pac-12 Sixth Player of the Year - Aleah Goodman (2018), Raegan Beers (2023), Timea Gardiner (2024)
- Pac-12 Freshman of the Year - Raegan Beers (2023)
- 10 - First team All Pac-12
- 22 - All Pac-12
- 4 - Pac-12 All Academic First Team
- 20 - Pac-12 All Academic Team
- WCC Honors - Kelsey Rees (2025), AJ Marotte (2025)

== Facilities ==
Prior to the construction of Gill Coliseum in 1950, the club version of the women's team played their games in the Women's Building on campus.

Opened in 2013 the OSU Basketball Center is a shared practice facility for both the men's and women's basketball teams. Amenities include an indoor basketball court, locker rooms, training and medical areas, and service and mechanical spaces. Additionally the space contains offices for coaches and other team personnel along with the OSU basketball hall of fame honoring achievements of both past and present. The facility is 34,500 square feet and cost $15 million to complete.

== NCAA tournament results ==
Oregon State has appeared in the NCAA Division I women's basketball tournament fourteen times. They have a record of 19−14.

Year	Seed	Round	Opponent	Result
1983	#3	First Round; Sweet Sixteen	#6 UCLA #2 Long Beach State	W 75−62; L 72–92
1984	#5	First Round	#4 Montana	L 47–56
1994	#11	First Round	#6 Alabama	L 86–96
1995	#5	First Round; Second Round	#12 Tennessee State #4 Western Kentucky	W 88−75 (OT); L 78–85
1996	#6	First Round	#11 Stephen F. Austin	L 65–67
2014	#9	First Round; Second Round	#8 Middle Tenn #1 South Carolina	W 55−36; L 69–78
2015	#3	First Round; Second Round	#14 South Dakota State #11 Gonzaga	W 74−62; L 64–76
2016	#2	First Round; Second Round; Sweet Sixteen; Elite Eight; Final Four	#15 Troy #10 Saint Bonaventure #6 DePaul #1 Baylor #1 Connecticut	W 73−31; W 69–40; W 83–71; W 60–57; L 51–80
2017	#2	First Round; Second Round; Sweet Sixteen	#15 Long Beach State #7 Creighton #3 Florida State	W 56−55; W 64–52; L 53–66
2018	#6	First Round; Second Round; Sweet Sixteen; Elite Eight	#11 Western Kentucky #3 Tennessee #2 Baylor #1 Louisville	W 82−58; W 66–59; W 72–67; L 43–76
2019	#4	First Round; Second Round; Sweet Sixteen	#13 Boise State #5 Gonzaga #1 Louisville	W 80−75 (OT); W 76–70; L 44–61
2021	#8	First Round; Second Round	#9 Florida State #1 South Carolina	W 83−59; L 42–59
2024	#3	First Round; Second Round; Sweet Sixteen; Elite Eight	#14 Eastern Washington #6 Nebraska #2 Notre Dame #1 South Carolina	W 73–51; W 61–51; W 70–65; L 58–70
2025	#14	First Round	#3 North Carolina	L 49–70
