= History of Oregon State University =

Chronological account of notable events at Oregon State University

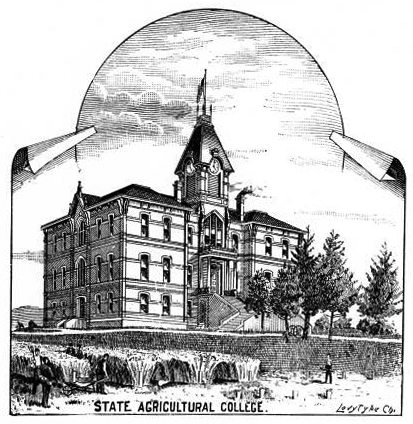
Benton Hall circa 1889

Oregon State University was founded as a small secondary and college preparatory school in the center of Oregon's Willamette Valley in 1856. The early school was first known as Corvallis Academy and served as the first public college in the American Northwest - known then as the Oregon Territory. Shortly after Oregon was established, state leaders secured federal funding from the Morrill Land-Grant Acts to support the school, making it Oregon's designated agricultural college. Since its inception, Oregon's first public college has seen over 20 presidents and transformed from a single building to a 577 acres (2.34 km^{2}) campus with over 36,000 students (2023).

== Corvallis College ==
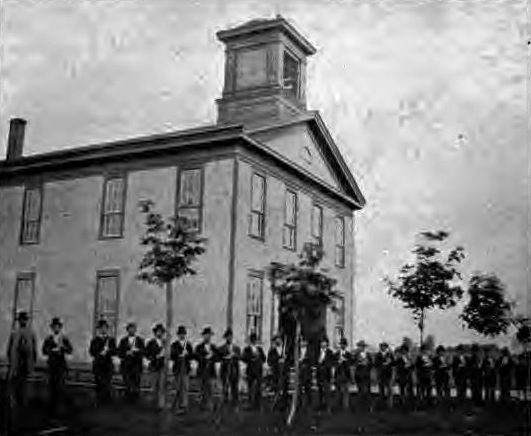
Corvallis College in 1876

In 1856, a school building was constructed in one of the Northwest's early pioneer settlements, known as Corvallis, Oregon. The structure would serve as home to a public academy until 1858. Initially named Corvallis Academy, the school served as the region's first public school for primary and college preparatory education. The local chapter of the Freemasons played a central role in developing the school's campus blueprint. Later the Freemasons initiated construction of what would become Oregon's first public college with the original donation of land.

The school's first administrator and teacher was John Wesley Johnson, a famous figure in Oregon higher education. Within the first decade of operation, the school began to offer college-level coursework. In 1860, ownership was briefly transferred to the Methodist Episcopal Church, making it a privately sponsored school for the next eight years. In 1865, William A. Finley was named as the school's first president and the school began offering a bachelor's degree.

== State school ==
Corvallis College was designated Oregon's agricultural college in 1868 and incorporated by the church the same year. In 1873, the school became the first West Coast school to offer a course in agriculture. The two-year program was approved by the Oregon Legislative Assembly. The college was always a recognized public school, but became a completely state-run school in 1885. In 1889, the original Corvallis College building was torn down. In 1888 the college informally became known as Oregon Agricultural College (OAC), a name not made official until 1907.

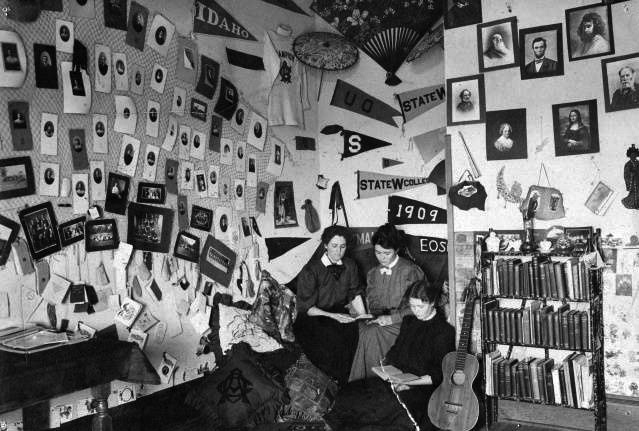
Three women in a dormitory room in Waldo Hall c. 1905

By 1934, Mary J. L. McDonald made donations that allowed for the purchase of the land that comprises the McDonald Forest owned by the school, which also includes Peavy Arboretum.

== Oregon State ==
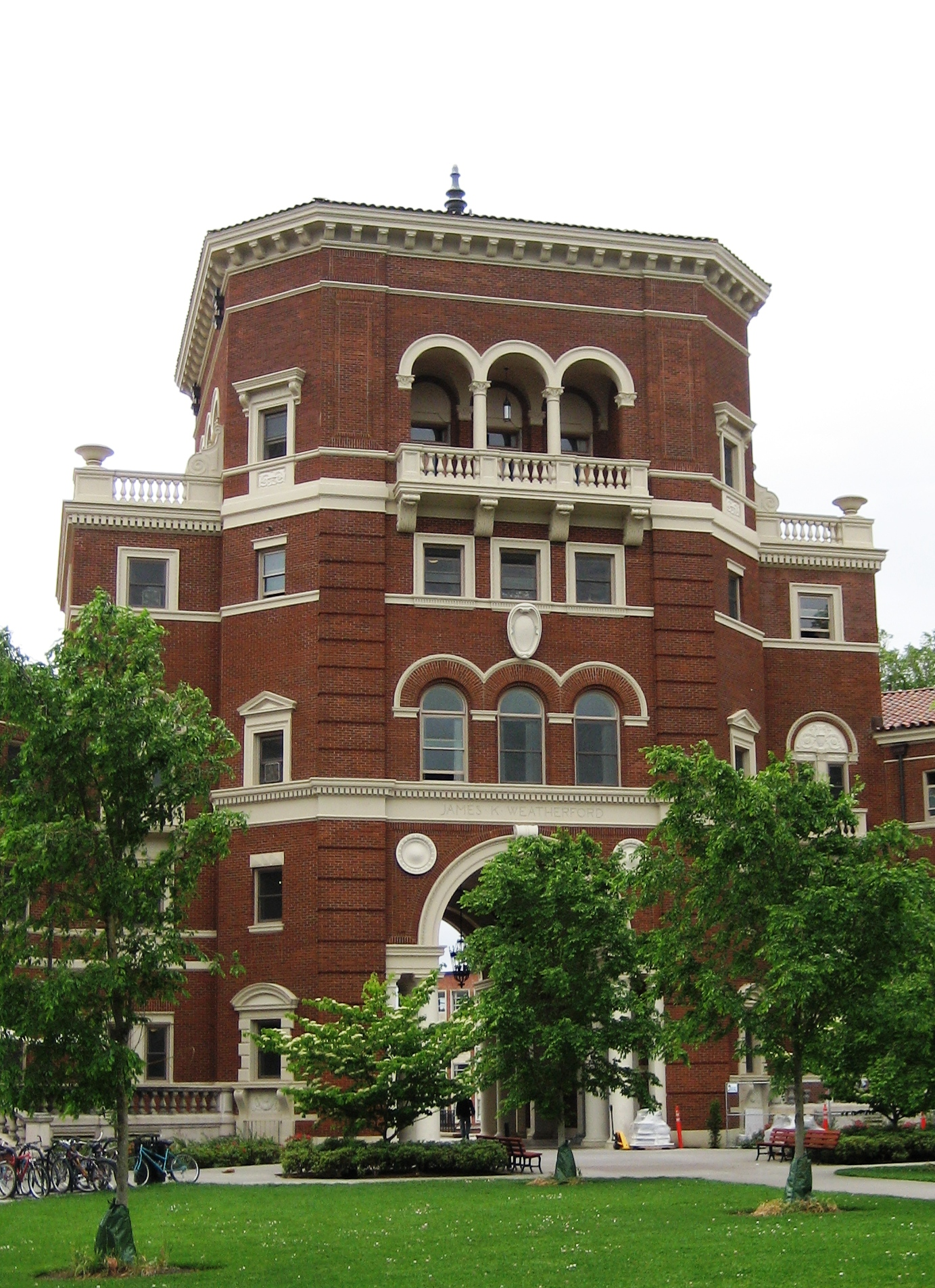
Weatherford Hall built in 1928. The building is named after James K. Weatherford, longtime head of the university's Board of Regents.

The school's growing diversity in degrees led to another name change in 1937, when the college became Oregon State College.

Naval ROTC, and the program of Naval Sciences, were added to the existing Army ROTC program in 1946. The Air Force ROTC program was included in 1949, making Oregon State one of only 33 universities in the country to offer officer training for all branches of the United States Armed Forces.

Although OSU's academics mainly focused on agriculture, engineering and business through the 1960s; liberal arts remained an important part of the curriculum throughout its history. In fact, one of the more famous novelists of the 20th century taught English composition in 1940s and 50s. Bernard Malamud used his experiences as a professor at OSU for the basis of his novel A New Life. He was also awarded the 1967 Pulitzer Prize for his novel The Fixer, named after a store in downtown Corvallis. Malamud's most famous book, The Natural, was said to have been greatly influenced by OSU's first appearance in the college world series playoffs in 1952.

Linus Pauling, Class of 1922, became Oregon State's first Nobel Laureate alumnus in 1954 when he received the Nobel Prize in Chemistry for his work elucidating the nature of the atomic bonds. In 1962, he was awarded the Nobel Peace Prize for his campaign against nuclear weapons testing. He joined Marie Curie as the only person to win two different Nobels. Curie's physics prize was shared with her husband, Pierre Curie. Both of Pauling's prizes were unshared. The university's current title, Oregon State University, was adopted on March 6, 1961 by a legislative act signed into law by Governor Mark Hatfield. A new library, the William Jasper Kerr Library, opened in 1963. That building was expanded twice, and after the latest expansion nearly doubled the size that ended in 1999, the library was renamed as The Valley Library.

== School presidents ==
The position of President was created in 1865. From 1868 to 1929 the president reported to the institution's own Board of Trustees/Regents. Since the creation of the Oregon University System (OUS), the president has reported to the OUS chancellor.

List of presidents:

No.	Image	President	Term start	Term end	Refs.
Corvallis College (1865–1907)
1		William A. Finley	1865	1872	
acting		Joseph Emery	June 1872	September 1872	
2		Benjamin L. Arnold	1872	January 30, 1892 (Note: Died in office.)	
acting		John D. Letcher	January 30, 1892	1892	
3		John M. Bloss	1892	1896	
4		H. B. Miller	1896	1897	
5		Thomas M. Gatch	1897	1907	
Oregon Agricultural College (1907–1937)
6		William Jasper Kerr	1907	1932	
acting		George Wilcox Peavy	1932	1934	
7		George Wilcox Peavy	1934	1940	
Oregon State College (1937–1961)
8		Frank Llewellyn Ballard	1940	1941	
acting		Francois Archibald Gilfillan	1941	1942	
9		August Leroy Strand	1942	1961	
Oregon State University (1961–present)
10		James Herbert Jensen	1961	1969	
acting		Roy Alton Young	1969	1970	
11		Robert William MacVicar	1970	1984	
12		John V. Byrne	1984	1995	
13		Paul G. Risser	1996	2002	
acting		Timothy P. White	2003	August 31, 2003	
14		Edward John Ray	September 1, 2003	June 30, 2020	
15		F. King Alexander	July 1, 2020	March 31, 2021 (Note: President Alexander resigned after a report was release concerning the mishandling of numerous sexual misconduct allegations at Louisiana State University, where he had served as president before OSU.)	
acting		Edward Feser (Note: Provost Edward Feser served as acting president the university after President Alexander's resignation until an interim president was selected.)	April 1, 2021	April 30, 2021	
interim		Rebecca Johnson	May 1, 2021	September 8, 2022	
16		Jayathi Murthy	September 9, 2022	present	

Table notes:

== See also ==
- Oregon State Beavers
