= Oregon State University Army ROTC =

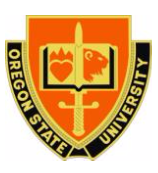
- Distinctive Unit Insignia
- Active: 1873–present
- Country: United States of America
- Branch: US Army
- Type: Reserve Officers' Training Corps
- Size: Battalion
- Garrison/HQ: Corvallis, Oregon
- Nickname: The West Point of the West
- Mottos: Fortitude and Courage
- Colors: Orange and black
- Mascot: Oregon State Beavers

Commanders
- Ceremonial chief: General Ulysses G. McAlexander

Insignia
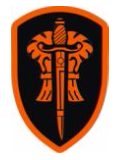
- Identification symbol

Oregon State University Army ROTC is an ROTC Battalion assigned to Oregon State University (OSU) in Corvallis, Oregon. Its mission is to train cadets in basic military leadership and prepare them for a career as an officer in the U.S. Army. At graduation, after completing both the program and a degree, cadets are then commissioned as 2nd Lieutenants. Founded in 1873, the ROTC Battalion has continued to serve the nation and U.S. Army Cadet Command. During World War II, the OSU ROTC produced more commissioned officers than any other non-military academy in the U.S., earning it the nickname "The West Point of the West".

== Pre-Civil War ==
Prior to the American Civil War, the small number of officers the Army needed was provided by the United States Military Academy at West Point, New York and a few other colleges, such as Norwich University. With the expansion of the Army to unprecedented size for the Civil War, the need for trained officers quickly exceeded the number available. As a result, Congress passed the Land Grant Act of 1862, which specified that courses in military tactics should be offered at colleges established as a result of the Act. Corvallis College (now Oregon State University) was founded in 1858 as an academy supported by the Methodist Church.

== 1868–1906; educating the citizen soldier ==
Corvallis College was named a Land-Grant institution in 1868, and thus was required to begin teaching military science. The first students were described as "being fine of muscle and brain but had to be taught to read and do simple arithmetic," perhaps explaining why military training did not begin immediately.

A new college president, Benjamin Lee Arnold, a Confederate veteran, arrived in the spring of 1872 "prepared to take charge of neglected military tactics as soon as arms arrived." Captain Benjamin D. Boswell of the 11th Infantry Regiment (and had served with the 4th West Virginia Infantry during the Civil War) was on extended leave and had been voluntarily helping with the Cadets. In September 1873, he was "regularly retained as Professor of Military Science." CPT Boswell wrote about three difficulties: "There was sometimes no suitable room for drilling, there were no books on military science in the city, and that the boys were farmer's sons they went home on good days to help with the planting and harvesting when the weather was best for drilling."

For about four years a varied collection of blue uniforms were worn until 1876, when President Arnold arranged for a local tailor to have the first official Cadet uniforms made. Gray, with caps of the Civil War type, it has long been speculated that they were inspired by Arnold's Confederate background, or perhaps from the "long gray line" of the US Military Academy at West Point. Each Cadet purchased his own for $16 to $18, depending on size.

Education in military tactics continued until 1877 when all guns were taken for the Nez Perce Wars, so "drill was not among the college activities of the time." In 1884, college president Arnold made a passionate plea to the legislature for 60 to 70 guns to replace those taken and never returned. Finally, in 1886, guns and a cannon were sent from Fort Vancouver and drill and military tournaments began again. A Cadet band was organized in 1891 consisting of 13 pieces obtained by private subscription. The new band, together with two companies of Cadets, marched down the railroad station to perform when President William Henry Harrison arrived on the Presidential train.

The second Regular Army officer, 1LT C. F. Dentler, was detailed by the War Department as Professor of Military Science in 1894. When he arrived, he was put in charge of Cauthorn Hall (now Kidder Hall), a dormitory known for the unruly behavior of its occupants. It is reported that "he put in operation War Department rules for behavior. In a short time Cauthorn was an orderly place, and every student was getting better grades in his classwork." That summer (1894), the Cadets marched in the Portland, Oregon parade and were very popular with the 1st Oregon soldiers who "swarmed them to get all manner of drinks," since they were they only military unit carrying canteens. Uniforms returned to 'army blue' in 1896 after a vote of the Cadets.

In 1898, all regular officers and National Guard officers were needed on active duty for the Spanish–American War. Lieutenant Woodbridge Geary, US Army, who'd been Professor of Military Science for two years, was killed in the Philippine Islands. The Cadet Battalion of 1901 commemorated his service with a marble slate. In 1898, the Mechanical Hall, which held all the military equipment, burned down, destroying everything. Later that year, Major Edwards of the Oregon National Guard, arrived fresh from the Spanish–American War to head the military program. He instituted many changes: New Springfield rifles; the first Armory (now Mitchell Playhouse) was built; encampments were introduced. These three day encampments were conducted four miles southwest of Corvallis and became community affairs. City merchants brought out crates of oranges for the Cadets and visitors came to the camp, "an enjoyment long to be remembered."

== 1906–1941; an era of growth ==
1LT D.P. Quinlan, 5th Cavalry, US Army, had arrived as the new Professor of Military Science in 1905. By this time there were four companies of infantry, with detachments of field artillery, Cavalry, Engineers, Signal, and Hospital Corps and a 28-piece band. The blue uniform changed to olive drab, handsome with a black visored cap, white gloves and puttees. The college insignia was worn on it, and an orange hat band and orange breast cord were added for dress. The buttons had OAC on them, for the then Oregon Agricultural College.

Two historic leaders were at OAC during this period: College President William Jasper Kerr, who was far seeing in his objectives and believed in the distribution of responsibility; and Captain Ulysses G. McAlexander, whose record as a commandant and soldier was outstanding. McAlexander was commandant and professor of Military Science and Tactics from 1907–1912, and again from 1915–1916. While at OAC, he increased the battalions to four, and replaced the old Springfield rifles with the then modern Krag–Jørgensen rifles, securing 720 of them for the 700 Cadets. The military band was increased to 60 pieces and played at commencements. Captain H. L. Beard, long their conductor, took the band to the 1915 Panama–Pacific International Exposition in San Francisco, California, where they played for a month, bringing much acclaim to Oregon State.

With the increasing size and popularity of the Cadet regiment, the Oregon Legislative Assembly passed an act providing for the construction of the present armory. Completed in 1910, the Armory was one of the largest and finest in the country. The 100 x 300 ft. riding hall allowed the Cadets to practice on horseback in all kinds of weather. The Cadets placed a bronze tablet, dedicating the building on 12 June 1911, to McAlexander "In Appreciation of whom, we the members of the Cadet Regiment of 1911, have placed this plate." It can be seen today on the north wall of the building. In World War I, Major McAlexander became world-famous as the "Rock of the Marne," while leading the 38th Infantry Regiment of the 3rd Infantry Division, and later as a major general who commanded the "Texas" Brigade of the 90th Infantry Division. He was also awarded the military's second highest decoration, the Distinguished Service Cross.

By 1917, the military instruction had become so efficient that the War Department classified OAC as a "Distinguished College." Regular training was discontinued during World War I and the Student Army Training Corps (SATC) was established in 1918 (distinct from ROTC) to meet the demands for officers in the war. In this accelerated program there were over 3,000 students carrying 14 hours of collegiate work weekly (principally in engineering) besides their military subjects.

The National Defense Act of 1916 had established the Reserve Officers' Training Corps (ROTC) and in January 1919, after the war ended, military training was reestablished as ROTC. Five major departments were organized: Infantry, Field Artillery, Engineering, Motor Transport, and Cavalry. Polo teams were begun, coached by the ROTC officers.

In the 1930s, the rifle team won the "Doughboy of the West" trophy; the college continued to be rated "Distinguished College" by the War Department; and polo matches against schools such as Stanford University kept Oregon State ROTC in the limelight. The ROTC band became two separate bands and presented over 200 weekly broadcasts on KOAC, Military Balls added to the glamour.

However, an era was ending. The Cavalry dismounted in the mid-30s and horses were dispensed with entirely in 1937, when the field artillery "heavy horses" were replaced by motor vehicles.

== 1941–1945; a nation at war ==
Oregon State College was referred to as the "West Point of the West" during these years. More Cadets were commissioned than at any other non-military academy in the United States. In 1942, there were 1,683 ROTC Cadets. 110 officers were commissioned that year and went immediately into service. By 1945 more Cadets were commissioned than at any other school in the West.

Enlistments lowered ROTC enrollments drastically during the war years, but in March 1943, an Army Specialized Training Program (ASTP) came into existence to provide troop technical training in engineering, communications, and languages. A student from those years remembers that at the beginning of the war all the young men were immediately put into uniform. Most of them were absorbed elsewhere, but the engineers stayed, later to be joined by ASTP groups.

In all, over 2,000 men were trained at the University while about 9,000 graduates and former students, many of them had their military training at Oregon State, served on active duty during World War II.

== 1946–1978; educating for global involvement ==
After the Second World War ended in 1945, a Department of Naval Science was added at Oregon State. Providing officer training for both the US Navy and the US Marine Corps, it is now one of the largest in the nation and has earned the unofficial title "Naval Academy of the Northwest." Women were admitted to the Naval program for the first time in 1972, and over 1,000 Navy and Marine officers have been commissioned since the beginning of the program.

The US Air Force was established in 1948, with the enactment of the National Security Act of 1947. On 1 July 1949, the US Army Air Corps training branch became a separate officer training unit now known as Aerospace Science. The Air Force ROTC draws more freshmen scholarships than any other AFROTC unit in the nation and has had over 1,000 officers commissioned, including the first women in 1970. In 1977, two graduates of the OSU AFROTC became the first women pilots in the Air Force. Today, the Army and Air Force ROTC programs at the University share the McAlexander Fieldhouse.

The Army ROTC, from its beginning in 1917, had commissioned enough officers to make Oregon State the leader in the nation among non-military schools. In 1973, women were admitted to Army ROTC. Now the ROTC has very little military drill and the emphasis is on leadership training and general professional education. Military training has changed tremendously since the early drills on muddy grounds near Benton Hall.

In 1962, ROTC was changed from mandatory participation for physically able male students to a completely voluntary program. In 1964, the ROTC Vitalization Act brought scholarships and financial aid to a streamlined ROTC program, and OSU attracts more scholarship winners than of any other school of its size in the nation. Leadership, scholasticism, technical, and scientific training are emphasized, as well as physical fitness. During this era, Cadets attending Western Oregon University and the Oregon State University Cascades Campus also became members of the Beaver Battalion and train with them during labs and field training exercises. With over one hundred years of history, Army ROTC at Oregon State University and its partner schools continues to train junior officers and commission them into various fields of the Army.

== Bibliography ==
- Smith, John E. (1953). Corvallis College. Corvallis, Oregon: J.E. Smith. p. 60. ASIN B002WMHJIK. OCLC 33186873.
- Brown, Martin E. (1874). Biennial Report of the State Agricultural College (1st). Salem, Oregon: Oregon State Printer. p. 17. OCLC 903486326.
- Skeen, Donald (1930s). The Projected Oregon State Agricultural College, 1862-1932. OCLC 33186770.
- Keyser, Helen (1958). The history of Oregon's land grant college : 1850-1892. Corvallis, Oregon: Oregon State University. p. 11.
- Horner, John B. (1920). History of Oregon State College, 1865-1907. Corvallis, Oregon: Oregon State University. p. 11. OCLC 52147397.
- Gearhart, Richard (Dick) Charles, ed. (1938). The Orange and Black : Oregon State College 1868 - 1938. Corvallis, Oregon: The Oregon State College Alumni Association. p. 207. OCLC 18282513.
- Partlow, Leo L. - Captain, F.A. (D.O.L.), U.S. Army (1921). History of the Military Department - Oregon Agricultural College ((internal)Cadet Course Catatlog). Corvallis, Oregon: OAC Press. Oregon State University-Special Collections and Archive Research Center: Memorabilia Collection, Box 106, folder 17.
