= Francis S. Hoyt =

American educator (1822–1912)

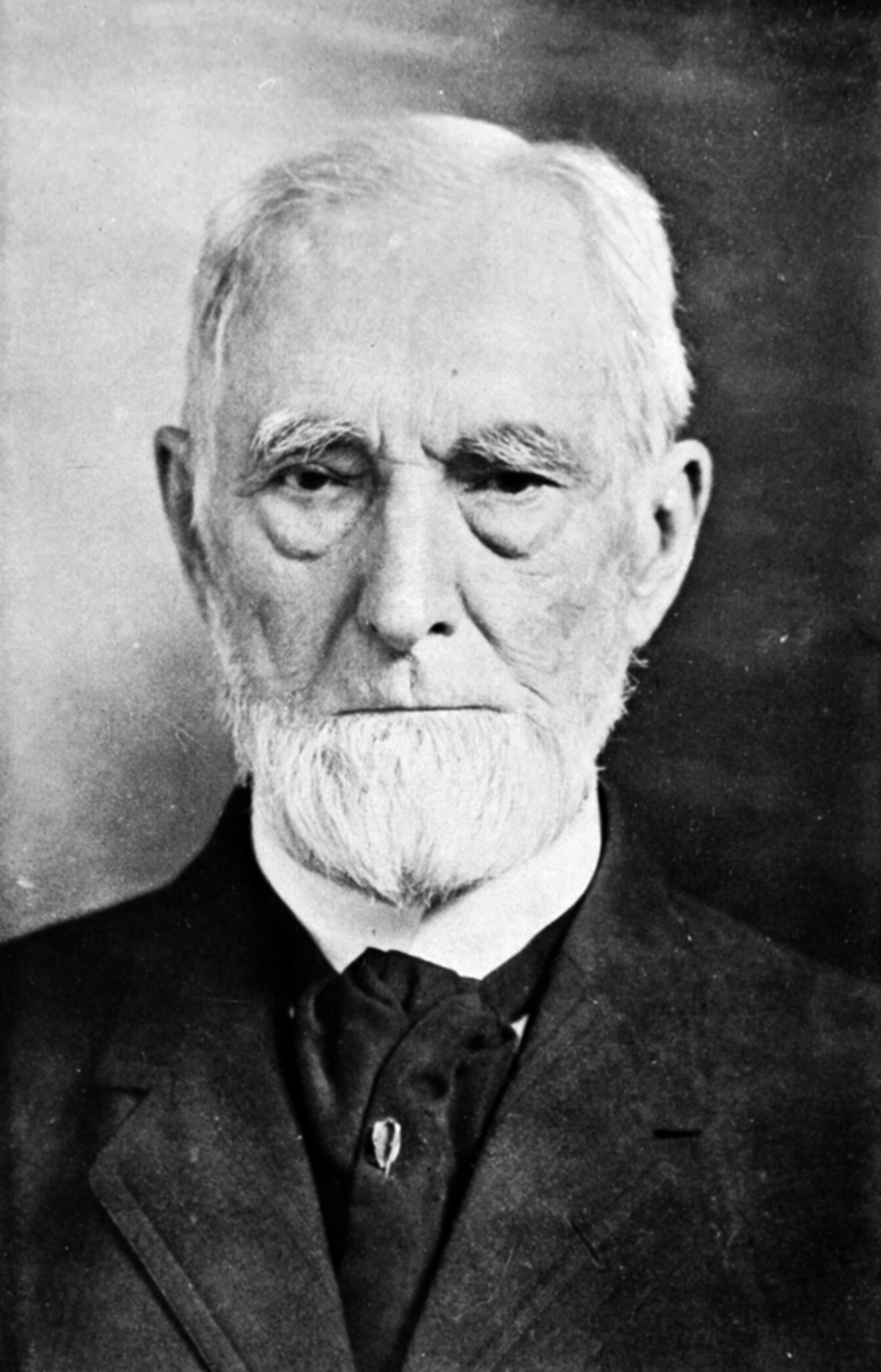

1st President of Willamette University
- In office 1853–1860
- Preceded by: position created
- Succeeded by: Thomas Milton Gatch

Personal details
- Born: November 5, 1822 Lyndon, Vermont
- Died: January 21, 1912 (aged 89) Craftsbury, Vermont
- Spouse: Phebe M. Dyar
- Children: 6
- Education: Wesleyan University
- Profession: Educator
- Willamette University info

Francis Southack Hoyt (November 5, 1822 – January 21, 1912) was an American educator from the state of Vermont. A minister and the son of a minister, he served as the first President of Willamette University in Salem, Oregon, where he and his wife were also teachers. Hoyt also taught at Ohio Wesleyan University and Baldwin University, and served as editor of several publications.

== Early life ==
Francis Hoyt was born in Lyndon, Vermont, on November 5, 1822. He was the son of Lucinda Hoyt (née Freeman) and Benjamin Ray Hoyt (1789–1872). His father was a minister and a founder of Wesleyan University in Middletown, Connecticut. The younger Hoyt's early education came at Newbury Seminary in Vermont before he attended Wesleyan where he graduated in 1844. Hoyt then served as the principal at Newbury. On December 24, 1848, he married Phebe M. Dyar, and they had six children.

== Willamette University ==
In 1850, Hoyt was hired by the Oregon Institute to replace Rev. Nehemiah Doane as principal of the schools. He was the school’s third principal and also taught classes along with his wife. Hoyt became president of the institution in 1853 when the school was chartered by the state as Wallamet University. He had helped get the Oregon Legislature to approve the new charter, and was then one of the original board members of the renamed school. In March 1855, he tendered his resignation, but did not leave the school.

While under his tenure the school changed to a three-term academic calendar and extended the curriculum to a four-year program for the college department. In early 1860 he was elected again to the board of trustees, but resigned as president in September of that year. Hoyt had accepted a position at Ohio Wesleyan University, though he did not leave until the end of the year. Overall, he served as president of Willamette from 1853 to 1860, with Thomas Milton Gatch replacing him as president.

== Later years ==
Hoyt left to become chairperson of the Theology department at Wesleyan. In 1872, Hoyt was hired as the editor of the Cincinnati based Western Christian Advocate. He was then hired at Baldwin University in Berea, Ohio, remaining until he retired in 1908. He had received a Doctor of Divinity from the school in 1869, and in 1873 the same degree from Wesleyan. Hoyt was active in the Methodist Church as well, serving as a delegate to several conferences over his lifetime. In 1868, he edited the Bible Hand Book. Francis S. Hoyt died on January 21, 1912, in Craftsbury, Vermont.

Academic offices
| Preceded by Position created | President of Willamette University; 1853–1860 | Succeeded by Thomas Milton Gatch |
