= Greenlee D. Letcher =

American politician

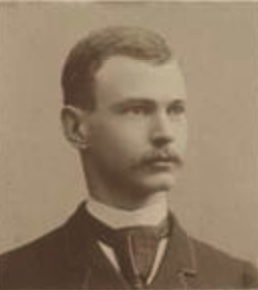
- Official portrait, 1892

Member of the Virginia House of Delegates from Rockbridge County
- In office December 4, 1889 – December 6, 1893
- Preceded by: William A. Anderson
- Succeeded by: R. G. Paxton

Personal details
- Born: Greenlee Davidson Letcher; July 19, 1867 Lexington, Virginia, U.S.
- Died: August 12, 1954 (aged 87) Lexington, Virginia, U.S.
- Party: Democratic
- Spouse: Katherine Paul
- Parent: John Letcher (father)
- Relatives: S. H. Letcher (brother); John D. Letcher (brother)
- Education: Virginia Military Institute; Washington & Lee University

Military service
- Branch/service: United States Army
- Years of service: 1917–1919
- Rank: Captain
- Unit: 111th Field Artillery
- Battles/wars: World War I

Greenlee Davidson Letcher (July 19, 1867 – August 12, 1954) was an American politician who served in the Virginia House of Delegates. He was the son of Governor John Letcher.
