= Louis Humphreys =

American physician (1816–1880)

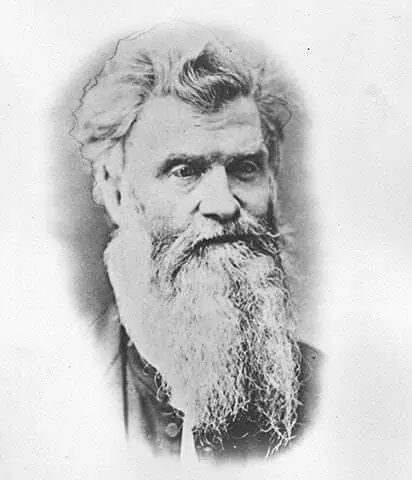
- Portrait of Humphreys

2nd Mayor of South Bend, Indiana
- In office 1868–1872
- Preceded by: William G. George
- Succeeded by: William Miller

Personal details
- Born: November 21, 1816 Springfield, Ohio, U.S.
- Died: May 9, 1880 (aged 63)
- Party: Republican
- Spouse: Margaret Pierson (m. 1844–)
- Children: 2

Louis Humphreys (September 21, 1816 – May 9, 1880) was an American medical doctor, and politician. He served as the medical inspector for the Union Army during the American Civil War, and was a two-term mayor of South Bend, Indiana.

== Early life and education ==
Humphreys was born on September 21, 1816, in Springfield, Ohio. His father John Humphreys was a native of Ireland and settled in Ohio in his early 20s. His mother was from Virginia. He attended Franklin Academy in Washington, Kentucky, and high school in Springfield, Ohio.

Humphreys came to South Bend, Indiana in 1838, where he studied medicine with his brother Harvey Humphreys. He later attended Indiana Medical College in La Porte, Indiana, and later Keokuk, Iowa; he graduated in 1844.

== Career ==
Humphreys was one of the founders of St. Joseph County Savings Bank. He was the second mayor of South Bend (1868–1870, and 1870–1872) and was a Republican.

Abraham Lincoln appointed him as one of eight medical inspectors for the United States Army. He served as the Commissioner of the Indiana Hospital for the Insane for four years. Humphreys was involved in organizing South Bend's original public library in 1872.

== See also ==
- List of mayors of South Bend, Indiana
