= William Miller (mayor) =

American mayor (1821–1901)

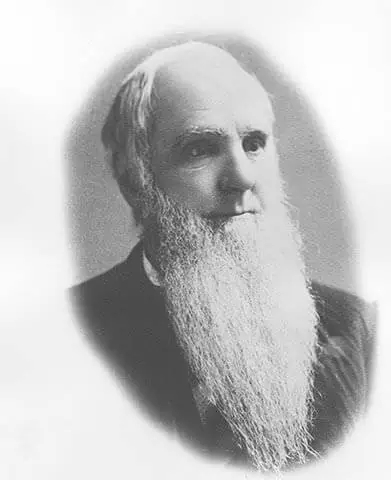
- Photo of Miller

3rd Mayor of South Bend
- In office 1872–1876
- Preceded by: Louis Humphreys
- Succeeded by: Alexander N. Thomas

Personal details
- Born: March 16, 1821 Lebanon County, Pennsylvania, U.S.
- Died: February 21, 1901 (aged 79) South Bend, Indiana, U.S.
- Resting place: South Bend City Cemetery; South Bend, Indiana, U.S.
- Party: Republican
- Spouse(s): Mary Kabbell Butler (m. 1874; died 1887) Mary Groff
- Relations: H. B. Miller (brother)
- Occupation: Politician; banker

William Miller (March 16, 1821 – February 21, 1901) was a banker and politician from South Bend, Indiana. He served as Mayor of South Bend from 1872 to 1876 and was on the city council.

== Early life ==
William Miller was born on March 16, 1821, in Lebanon County, Pennsylvania, to Henry Miller. His father was a farmer. Miller worked as a clerk in Harrisburg, Pennsylvania. Miller and his family moved to South Bend, Indiana, in August 1837. He attended the Bowman School, a log school house. His family lived at Stull Place in South Bend.

His brother was H. B. Miller, state senator from New York and founder of the Kalamazoo, Michigan Telegraph and the Buffalo Telegraph.

== Career ==
Miller worked as a clerk with the Harper Brothers in 1838. In 1846, Miller worked in the dry goods business and clerked for different firms. In 1849, Miller moved to California to engage in gold mining. He remained there for three years. Miller then worked with Dr. John A. Hendricks in contracting and did stone work on bridges and culverts on the Illinois Central Railroad from Calumet to Kankakee. In 1855, Miller moved from St. Louis, Missouri, back to South Bend. Miller worked with Alexis Coquillard in the milling business. After Coquillard's death, Miller formed a partnership with Dr. Hendricks and rebuilt Coquillard's mill. They continued the business until 1869.

In 1870, Miller became connected with the Thompson & Wykoff Bank. In 1871, it was organized as the South Bend National Bank. He worked there as cashier for over twenty years and served as the first president. He served as president until his death. Miller served as president of the Peninsular Railroad for three years. He also served as president of the Mishawaka Paper and Pulp Company.

Miller was a Republican. Miller served as Mayor of South Bend for two terms, from 1872 to 1876. He was succeeded by Alexander N. Thomas. Miller served as mayor during a debate about a replacement water system in South Bend. Miller served in the South Bend City Council.

== Personal life ==
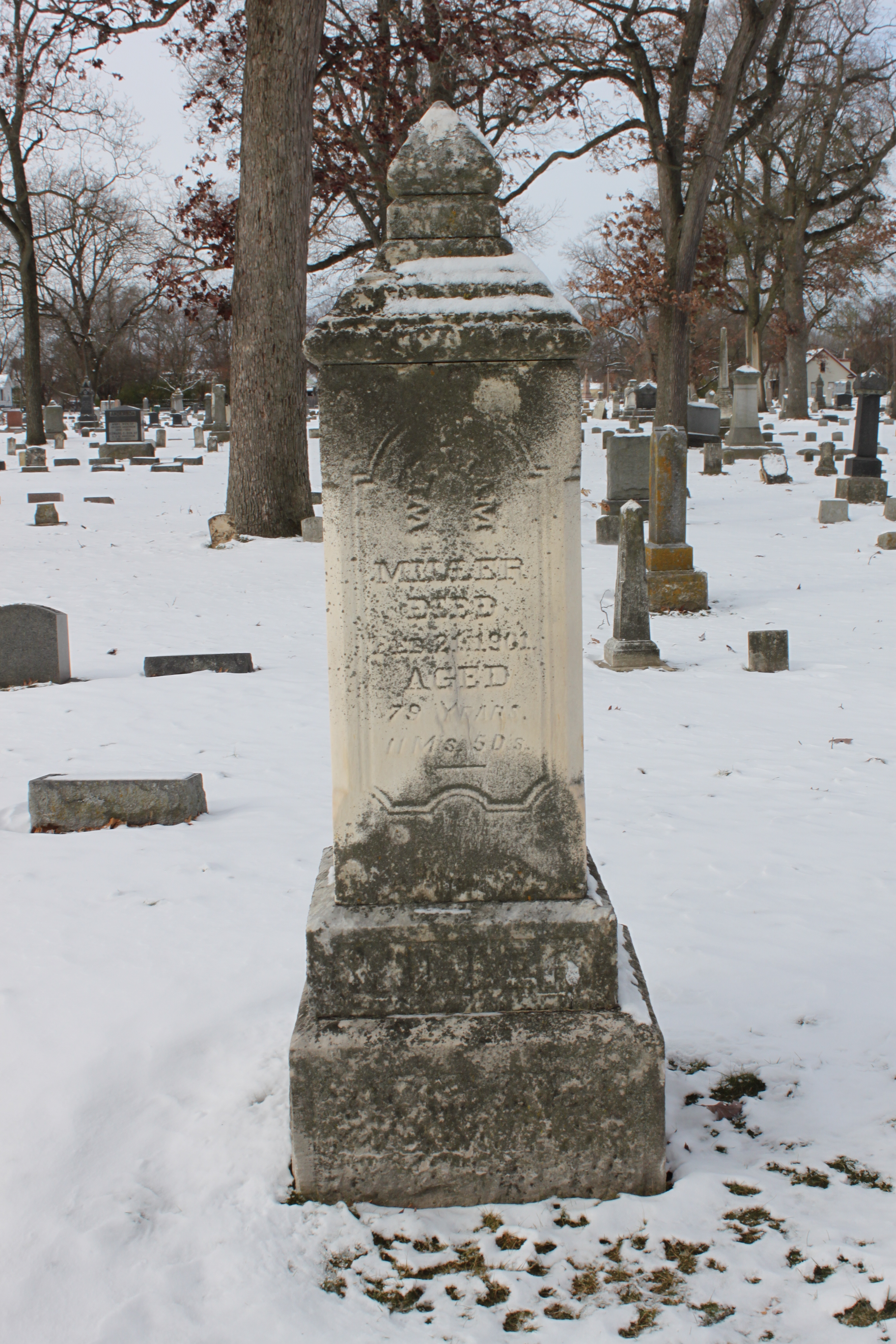
Grave of Miller in South Bend City Cemetery

Miller married three times. Miller married Mary Kabbell Butler of Brentwood, Essex, on February 5, 1874. His wife died on June 29, 1887. Miller also married Mary Groff. One of his children was William F. Miller, a businessman in South Bend.

Miller had a stroke on February 17 and died at his home at 321 North Michigan Street in South Bend on February 21, 1901. He was buried at South Bend City Cemetery.
