= Ulysses G. McAlexander =

United States Army general

Ulysses Grant McAlexander
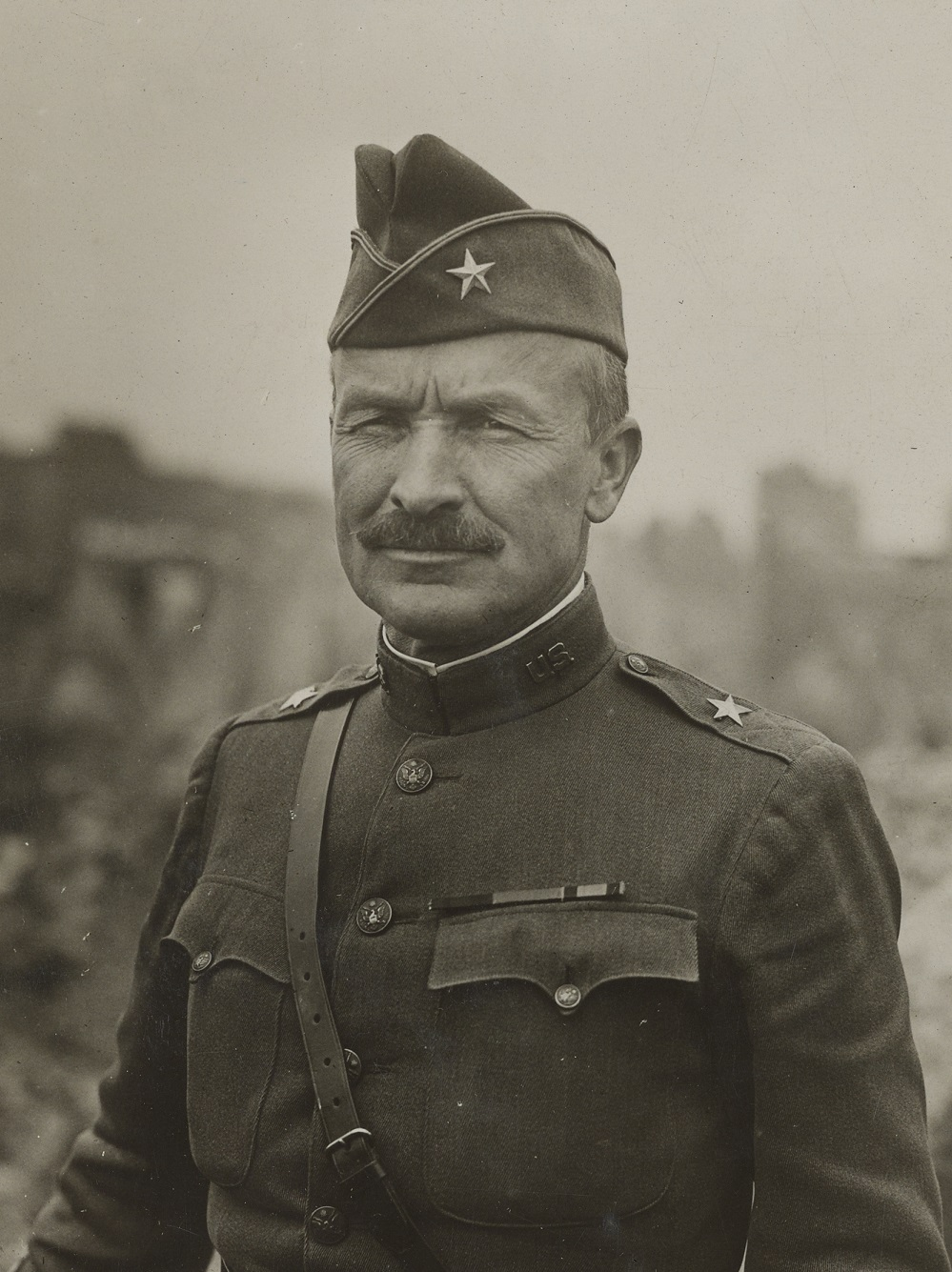
- McAlexander as commander of the 180th Brigade in Nantillois, France, 1918.
- Born: 30 August 1864; Dundas, Minnesota, US
- Died: 18 September 1936 (aged 72); Portland, Oregon, US
- Burial place: Arlington National Cemetery
- Education: United States Military Academy
- Spouse: May Skinner McAlexander
- Military career
- Allegiance: United States
- Branch: United States Army
- Service years: 1883–1924
- Rank: Major General
- Nickname: Mac
- Service number: 0-75
- Commands: 1891–95 Professor of Military Science Iowa Wesleyan College; 1900–02 13th Minnesota Volunteer Infantry; 1907–11 Professor of Military Science Oregon State College; 1917–18 18th Infantry Regiment; 1918 38th Infantry Regiment; 1918 3rd Infantry Division; 1918–19 180th Infantry Brigade, 90th Infantry Division
- Conflicts: American Indian Wars; Spanish–American War; Moro Rebellion; World War I; Second Battle of the Marne; Battle of Saint-Mihiel; Meuse-Argonne Offensive
- Awards: Distinguished Service Cross; Army Distinguished Service Medal; Silver Star Medal

Major General Ulysses Grant McAlexander (30 August 1864 – 18 September 1936) was an American officer who served in the United States Army. He was heavily decorated for valor and is one of the iconic fighting men of the American Expeditionary Forces (AEF) during World War I. He is most famous for commanding the 38th Infantry Regiment during the Second Battle of the Marne in July 1918 and earning himself and the regiment the moniker "Rock of the Marne" (later adopted by the entire 3rd Infantry Division).

== Early life ==
Ulysses Grant McAlexander was born on 30 August 1864 in Dundas, Minnesota during the American Civil War. He was named after General Ulysses S. Grant, the commander of the Union Army. His father was Commodore Perry McAlexander (named after Commodore Matthew C. Perry) and his mother was Margaret (Tilton) McAlexander. Ulysses was the fifth child of the family, and his elder siblings are: Mary Diana (1850–1941), Sarah Ellen (1852–1922), Alice Grace (1857–1880), and Emily (1861–1914). He also had a younger brother, Monroe (1868–1950). His youngest brother, Albert W.(b. 1875) did not live past his first year. Ulysses' father died in 1879 in McPherson, Kansas, and his mother died there in 1880. Growing up in Minnesota and Kansas, Ulysses excelled in academia and physical activities and was accepted into the United States Military Academy in West Point, New York, sponsored by Judge John D Milliken of McPherson, Kansas. He began his freshman (plebe) year there in 1883 as a Cadet.

== Military career ==
Ulysses G. McAlexander graduated West Point, 53rd of 64, and was commissioned as a second lieutenant of infantry in 1887. Among his classmates included several general officers of the future, including Charles B. Wheeler, Edward C. Young, Richmond P. Davis, Edgar Russel, George O. Squier, Ernest Hinds, George W. Gatchell, Charles H. Martin, P. D. Lochridge, Nathaniel F. McClure, William C. Rivers, William Weigel, Thomas G. Hanson, Herman Hall, Marcus D. Cronin, Alexander L. Dade, Charles S. Farnsworth, Charles Gerhardt, James T. Dean, Edmund Wittenmyer, Frederic D. Evans, Michael J. Lenihan, Mark L. Hersey and Frank H. Albright.

He was posted to Fort Meade, Dakota Territory, and Forts Custer and Missoula, Montana for service in the American Indian Wars. He served on the frontier without seeing combat until 1891, when he became the Professor of Military Science and Tactics at Iowa Wesleyan College. This was the first time Lieutenant McAlexander would train Cadets, and this experience helped him later in his career.

In 1898, when the Spanish–American War broke out, he joined the US Volunteers so he could serve overseas. Receiving a commission as Assistant Quartermaster of Volunteers, with the rank of captain, McAlexander entered the 28th US Volunteer Infantry Regiment and sailed for Cuba. During the Siege of Santiago, Capt. McAlexander received the Silver Star for "gallantry in action in the Santiago de Cuba Campaign, 22 June to 17 July 1898."

After returning to the United States, the young captain was soon placed in charge of the 13th Minnesota Volunteer Infantry Regiment sailing for the Philippines to combat the Philippine Insurrection. This unit was a veteran unit and had taken part in the Battle of Manila and the Battle of Malolos, and had experienced tough fighting in northern Luzon. Ulysses took over in 1900 and served in counter-insurgency operations until 1902. He and the regiment returned to the Philippines and fought from 1905–1906 until they were sent back to America. Until 1907, he served in Washington, D.C. as a member of US Army Headquarters general staff.

In 1907, Capt. McAlexander was sent to become the Professor of Military Science and Tactics at Oregon State College where he was admired by Cadets and the community of Corvallis, Oregon alike. He oversaw the training of the Oregon State University Army ROTC battalion along with the construction of the armory, which was completed in 1911 (in 1971, the armory was renamed the "McAlexander Fieldhouse"). Upon his promotion to major in 1911, Ulysses G. McAlexander was sent to be an active duty trainer and inspector for the Oregon Army National Guard. He served in this position until 1915, when he was again transferred to command the Oregon State Army ROTC battalion. He was promoted to lieutenant colonel in July 1916.

== World War I ==
When the United States entered the First World War in April 1917, McAlexander was promoted to colonel in May and sent to France to command the 18th Infantry Regiment of the 1st Division. He commanded that regiment during their early tenure in France when it was being trained in tactics by the French Army. However, he was relieved of command shortly after. It is said that McAlexander was relieved from his command position by General R. Bullard for profanely refusing to believe that the French could teach him anything about war. He was sent, instead, to serve with the Inspector General's staff.

McAlexander was assigned to command the newly arrived 38th Infantry Regiment of the 3rd Division, commanded by Major General Joseph T. Dickman, in May 1918. After the regiment was trained in trench warfare and modern tactics, it was moved into the line to help bolster the French positions. The French commander, General Jean de Montdésir, wanted to piecemeal the Americans among his troops, but McAlexander would have none of it, and the 38th wasn't budged until the 3rd Division was given a front of its own, in June, near Chateau-Thierry.

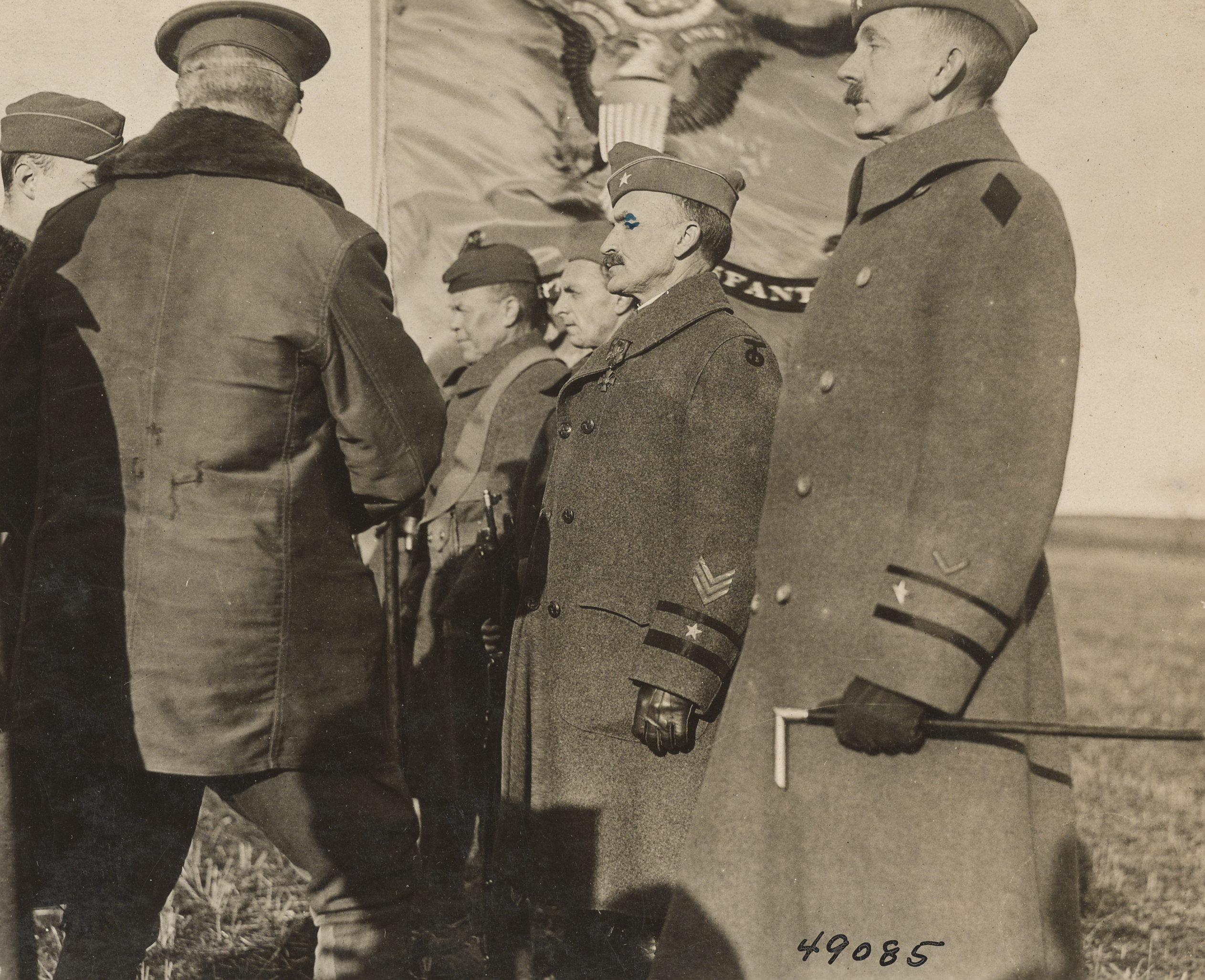
Major General Joseph T. Dickman pinning the Croix de Guerre on Brigadier General Ulysses G. McAlexander for his valorous conduct on the Marne River, in July 1918.

In July, the Germans launched an assault against the Allied line, known as the Second Battle of the Marne. A three-hour artillery pounding of the 3rd Division's position announced the beginning of the offensive. In the dark of night, boats ferried the first waves of troops from the German Seventh Army. In short order, French and American defenses closest to the southern flanks of the river crumbled and were overrun. The enemy was so well established on the 3rd Division's right flank that its position should have been untenable. As a result, McAlexander's 38th was beset from both sides. Apparently, McAlexander had expected just these developments. Without yielding his hold on the Marne embankment, McAlexander refused both flanks so that his regimental front stood like a horseshoe, one battalion forward, one on either side. The Germans attacks were unsuccessful and the regiment held out, maintaining their position. Because of their steadfastness, McAlexander and his 38th Infantry Regiment became known from then on as the Rock of the Marne. The German offensive was halted by 18 July 1918. For his decisive action, McAlexander received the Army Distinguished Service Medal, the citation for which reads:

The President of the United States of America, authorized by Act of Congress, July 9, 1918, takes pleasure in presenting the Army Distinguished Service Medal to Brigadier General Ulysses Grant McAlexander, United States Army, for exceptionally meritorious and distinguished services to the Government of the United States, in a duty of great responsibility during World War I. General McAlexander commanded the 38th Infantry Regiment, 3d Division, with marked distinction in repelling the German attack at Mezy, south of the Marne, in July 1918. He exhibited particular skill and energy as a Brigade Commander in the operations at the St. Mihiel salient and in the Argonne-Meuse offensive. The successful accomplishment of the missions of his Brigade in all cases were in a large measure due to this sound judgment and leadership.

On 22 July, the 38th Infantry Regiment launched an assault on Jaulgonne to prize it from the enemy. In the words of Capt. Jesse W. Woolridge, he enjoyed his finest five minutes of the war believing he was the spear of the assault, when he bumped into McAlexander, crawling forward at the very front of his regiment. McAlexander received the Distinguished Service Cross for this action. The citation for the medal reads:

The President of the United States of America, authorized by Act of Congress, July 9, 1918, takes pleasure in presenting the Distinguished Service Cross to Brigadier General Ulysses Grant McAlexander, United States Army, for extraordinary heroism in action while Commanding the 38th Infantry Regiment, 3d Division, A.E.F., near Jaulgonne, France, 22 July 1918. General McAlexander, then a colonel, commanding the 38th infantry, displayed exceptional gallantry when his regiment, attacking without support on either flank, was stopped by severe machine-gun and artillery fire, by going ahead of the most advanced elements of his command, and in full view of the enemy, leading his men by force of his own example to the successful assault of Jaulgonne and the adjoining heights. Later in the day, when progress was again checked, he personally reconnoitered to within 50 yards of hostile machine-gun nests, and through information thus obtained, was enabled to hold an advanced position, with both flanks exposed, for more than 36 hours.

After receiving a promotion to brigadier general, McAlexander was sent to command the newly arrived 180th Infantry Brigade, of the 90th Division, (nicknamed the "Alamo Division), in place of Brigadier General William Johnston Jr.. The 180th Brigade, the "Texas Brigade", consisted of the 359th Infantry Regiment and 360th Infantry Regiments, and the 343rd Machine Gun Battalion. Most of the soldiers came from Texas and were new to combat. McAlexander led them into their first battle at Saint-Mihiel on 12 September 1918 and quickly accomplished his objectives. In the much larger Meuse–Argonne offensive which soon followed, McAlexander's Texans took the fight to the enemy and attributed their success to their leader. After the war, the Texas veterans commissioned a portrait of McAlexander (currently on display in Austin, Texas) that evokes their admiration of their commander.

When the Great War ended on 11 November 1918, McAlexander stayed with the Allied occupation force in Germany until 1919, when he returned home.

== Post-War ==
When McAlexander returned to his family in 1919, he served in the Army a while longer until retiring with the rank of major general in 1924. He moved to Newport, Oregon that same year. Before he retired, he was commandant at Fort Douglas, just east of Salt Lake City, Utah. He was key in helping public relations with the Fort's civilian neighbors as he had a joint partnership in building the Fort Douglas Country Club in 1923. He helped with the construction of the Memorial Union on the Oregon State campus, and in 1930, Oregon State College bestowed upon him an honorary doctorate. In 1934, he unsuccessfully ran for governor in the 1934 Oregon gubernatorial election on the Republican ticket but was defeated by Joe E. Dunne. McAlexander died in Portland, Oregon on 18 September 1936, and is buried in Section 7 of Arlington National Cemetery.

== Bibliography ==
- Bullard, Robert Lee (2013). Fighting Generals: Illustrated Biographical Sketches of Seven Major Generals in World War I. Literary Licensing. ISBN 9781258861193.
- Davis, Henry Blaine Jr. (1998). Generals in Khaki. Raleigh, North Carolina: Pentland Press. ISBN 1571970886. OCLC 40298151.
- Venzon, Anne Cipriano (2013). The United States in the First World War: an Encyclopedia. Hoboken, NJ: Taylor and Francis. ISBN 978-1-135-68453-2. OCLC 865332376.
