= John D. Letcher =

American academic

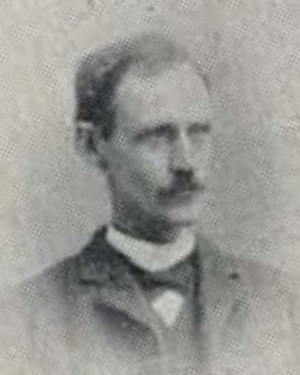
- Portrait of Letcher, 1894

President of Oregon State University (Note: The school did not adopt its present name until 1961. During Letcher's tenure, it was known as "Oregon Agricultural College.")
- Acting; January 1892 – June 1892
- Preceded by: Benjamin Lee Arnold
- Succeeded by: John M. Bloss

Personal details
- Born: John Davidson Letcher; October 16, 1853 Lexington, Virginia, U.S.
- Died: November 19, 1938 (aged 85) Lexington, Virginia, U.S.
- Parent: John Letcher (father)
- Relatives: S. H. Letcher (brother); Greenlee D. Letcher (brother)
- Occupation: Engineer; professor; university administrator

Academic background
- Education: Virginia Military Institute

Academic work
- Discipline: Mathematics; engineering; military tactics
- Institutions: Oregon Agricultural College (1888‍–‍1894); University of Oregon (1894‍–‍1896)

John Davidson Letcher (October 16, 1853 – November 19, 1938) was an American academic and an acting president of Oregon State University. He served as the acting president for 4 months in 1892, upon the death of the second president Benjamin Lee Arnold.

As a son of Virginia's Confederate governor John Letcher, John Davidson Letcher was born in Virginia and attended Virginia Military Institute, where he obtained a degree in civil engineering. With jobs in the field, he also taught mathematics in several colleges. It was in 1888 that he became a professor at Oregon State University (then "State Agricultural College of the State of Oregon") in Corvallis, Oregon, as the Professor both of Mathematics and Engineering and of Military Science and Tactics.

After OSU's third president Benjamin Lee Arnold suddenly died in January 1892, Letcher was elected unanimously by the Board of Regents as the acting president of the college. His presidency lasted until early June of the year, when John M. Bloss became the third permanent president of OSU. Letcher left the school in 1894 and then served as a mathematics professor of the University of Oregon in Eugene, Oregon until 1896. He returned to Virginia in 1896.
