= William Johnston Jr. =

U.S. Army major general

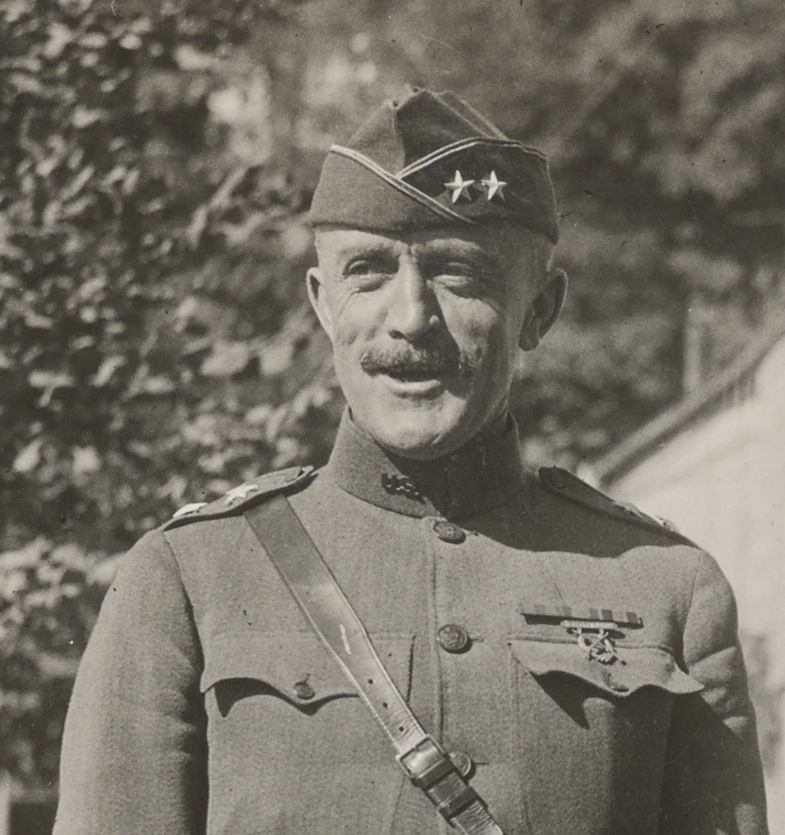
- Johnston in France, September 1918
- Born: October 19, 1861; Cincinnati, Ohio, United States
- Died: February 19, 1933 (aged 71); Nice, France
- Burial place: Arlington National Cemetery
- Alma mater: Washington University in St. Louis
- Military career
- Allegiance: United States
- Branch: Missouri Militia; Arizona Militia; United States Army
- Service years: 1878–1883 (Militia); 1883–1925 (Army)
- Rank: Major General
- Service number: 0-133
- Unit: Infantry Branch
- Commands: 1st Battalion, Philippine Scouts; Galveston, Texas Port of Embarkation; 180th Infantry Brigade; 91st Division; 1st Infantry Brigade; Fourth Coast Artillery District; 3rd Division
- Conflicts: Spanish–American War; Philippine–American War; World War I
- Awards: Distinguished Service Cross; Army Distinguished Service Medal; Silver Star

William Hartshorne Johnston Jr. (October 19, 1861 – February 19, 1933) was a United States Army officer who served for almost forty years. A veteran of the Spanish–American War, Philippine–American War, and World War I, he attained the rank of major general and was most notable for his World War I command of the 91st "Wild West" Division.

== Early life ==
Johnston was born in Cincinnati, Ohio, a son of Mary (Neele) Johnston and Colonel William Hartshorne Johnston, a U.S. Army paymaster. He was raised and educated at various Army posts and in St. Louis, Missouri, and attended Washington University School of Law from 1876 to 1879. While living in St. Louis, Johnston also worked as a salesman for the Scudders-Gale Grocery Company.

== Military career ==
=== Militia service ===
Johnston enlisted in the Missouri Militia in 1878, and rose to sergeant in the Lafayette Guard of St. Louis before moving to Prescott, Arizona in 1881. While in Arizona, he obtained a commission as a first lieutenant in the territorial militia's Prescott Rifles company, and he served until 1883. From November 1881 to October 1883, he was an Army paymaster's clerk.

In February 1883, Johnston was a resident of New York City when he competed for a Congressional appointment to the United States Military Academy. He was selected by a panel that made a recommendation to Representative Roswell P. Flower, but was subsequently declared ineligible because he did not meet the one-year state residency requirement. In July 1883, he was appointed a second lieutenant in the United States Army directly from civil life, subject to completion of an examination by a board of officers. When Johnston took the competitive examination, he placed first of 96 candidates. His commission in the 16th Infantry Regiment was confirmed in October.

=== Spanish–American War and Philippine–American War ===
In 1887, Johnston graduated with honors from the Infantry and Cavalry School at Fort Leavenworth, Kansas. While assigned to the faculty of first Western Military Academy in Alton, Illinois and later Saint Louis University, Johnston attended law school at Washington University in St. Louis. He was a student beginning in 1894, graduated in 1897, and received his LL.B. degree. At graduation, Johnston was awarded the honor of Prize Essayist of his senior class.

During the Spanish–American War, Johnston served with the 46th U.S. Volunteer Infantry as a major. Following the conflict, Johnston was mustered out of the volunteer service and was appointed military governor of Isabela Province on the Philippine island of Luzon, a post which he held from 1901 to 1902.

During the Philippine–American War, Johnston commanded the 1st Battalion of Philippine Scouts from 1904 to 1906 during the campaign against the Pulajanes, for which he was awarded the Silver Star. He returned to the U.S. in 1907 to attend the Army War College until 1908. After graduating, he rejoined the 16th Infantry at Fort Crook, Nebraska. As of 1911, he was serving in the Philippines as adjutant for the Department of the Visayas.

=== World War I ===
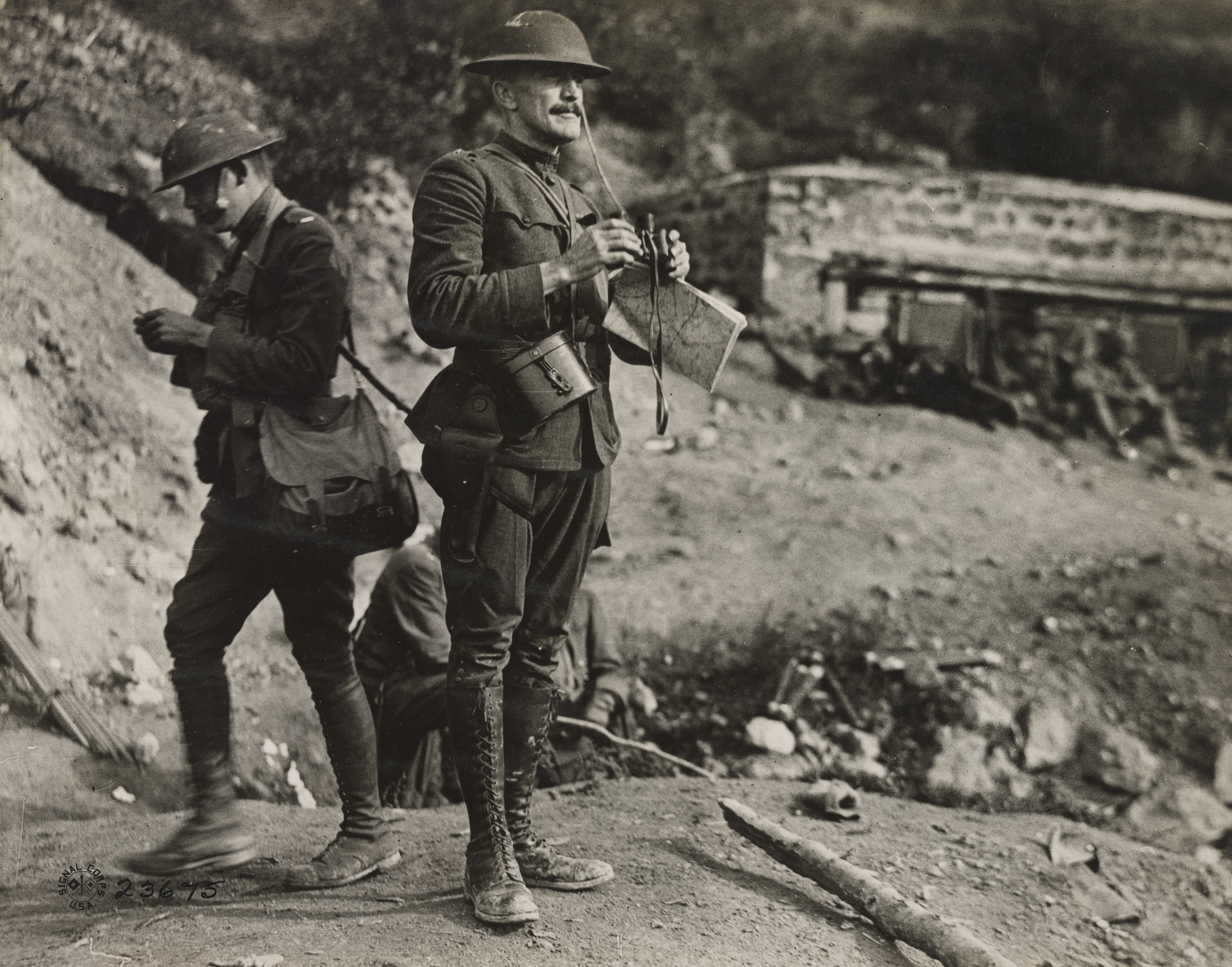
Major General William H. Johnston observing the progress of fighting in the Argonne forest, October 26, 1918.

Johnston was a lieutenant colonel assigned to the 26th Infantry Regiment and commander of the Galveston, Texas Port of Embarkation in October 1914 when he was assigned to the General Staff at the United States Army War College, where he remained until 1917. Following the American entry into World War I in April 1917, he was promoted to brigadier general and assigned to command the 180th Infantry Brigade, a unit of the 90th Division. He organized and trained the brigade, which he led to France. After arriving on the Western Front in August 1918, Johnston's brigade was stationed in the Toul Sector as part of I Corps.

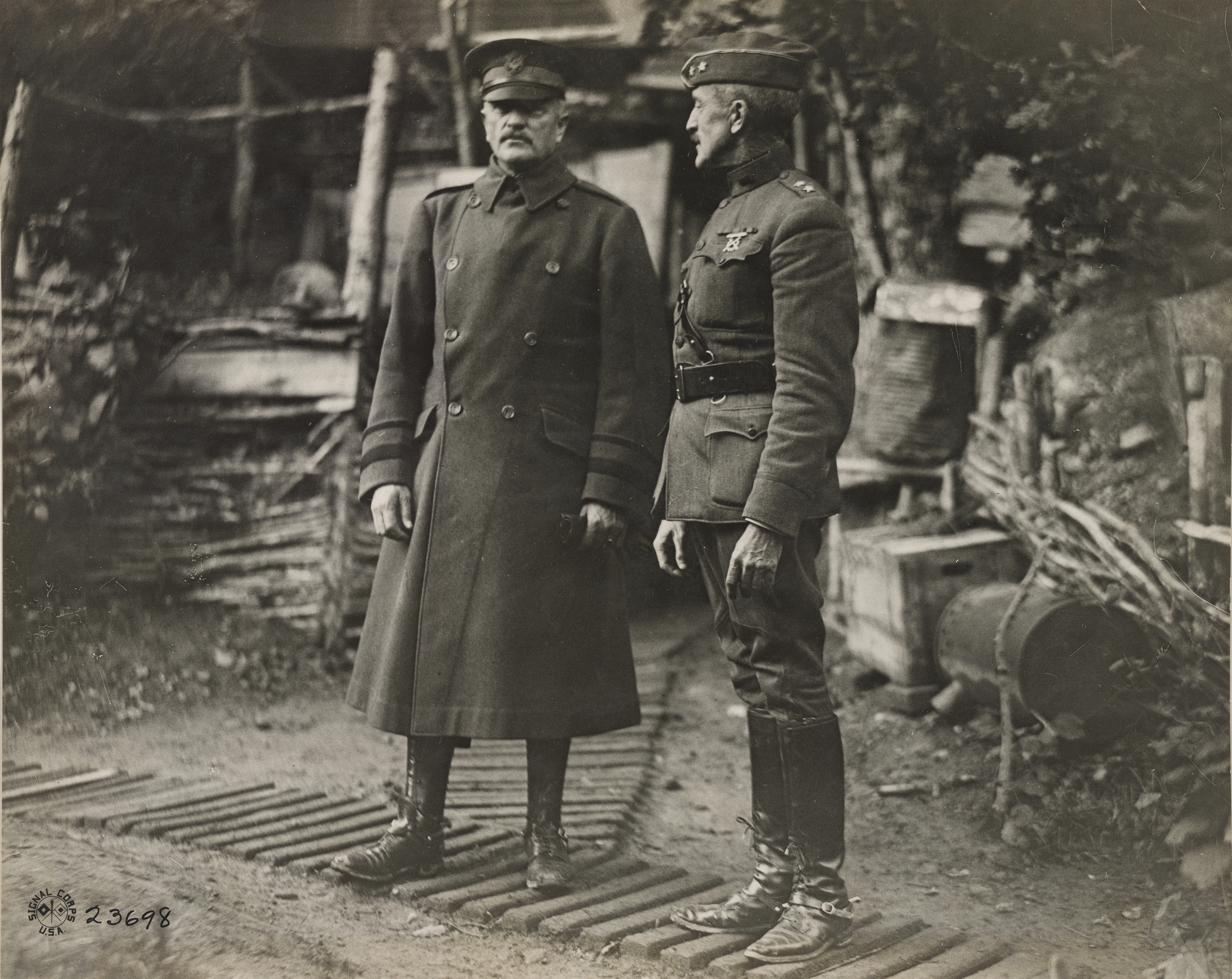
General John J. Pershing (left), C-in-C of the AEF in France, and Major General William H. Johnston, commanding the 91st Division, in the Argonne forest, October 26, 1918.

In late August Johnston was succeeded in command of the 180th Brigade by Brigadier General Ulysses G. McAlexander and was assigned to command the 91st Division, taking over from Brigadier General Frederick Steinman Foltz, who had been in temporary command. Having been promoted to divisional command, Johnston was soon promoted to major general. Under his command, and aided by Colonel Herbert J. Brees as his chief of staff, the 91st Division took part in the St. Mihiel offensive and the Meuse–Argonne offensive, for which he was awarded both the Distinguished Service Cross (DSC) (the second highest military decoration in the United States Armed Forces) along with the Army Distinguished Service Medal, and the Ypres-Lys campaign. The citation for his DSC reads:

The President of the United States of America, authorized by Act of Congress, July 9, 1918, takes pleasure in presenting the Distinguished Service Cross to Major General William H. Johnston, United States Army, for extraordinary heroism in action while serving as Commanding General of the 91st Division, A.E.F., northwest of Verdun, France, from 27 to 30 September 1918. Major General Johnston repeatedly showed exceptional bravery during the Argonne-Meuse offensive, frequently visiting his front lines under heavy fire from enemy artillery, machine-guns, and snipers, displaying marked coolness and inspiring the members of his command with confidence and determination.

The Army DSM states the following:

The President of the United States of America, authorized by Act of Congress, July 9, 1918, takes pleasure in presenting the Army Distinguished Service Medal to Major General William H. Johnston, United States Army, for exceptionally meritorious and distinguished services to the Government of the United States, in a duty of great responsibility during World War I. During the Meuse-Argonne offensive, General Johnston commanded with skill and ability, the 91st Division in the difficult advance that resulted in the taking of Epinonville. Later, in participation with the French, he led his Division with marked distinction in the attack on and capture of the important city of Audenarde in the closing operations of the war in Belgium.

For his leadership in the war, which ended on November 11, 1918, Johnston was additionally awarded the French Legion of Honor (Commander) and Croix de Guerre with Palm, the Belgian Order of Leopold I (Commander) and the Victory Medal.

=== Inter-war years ===
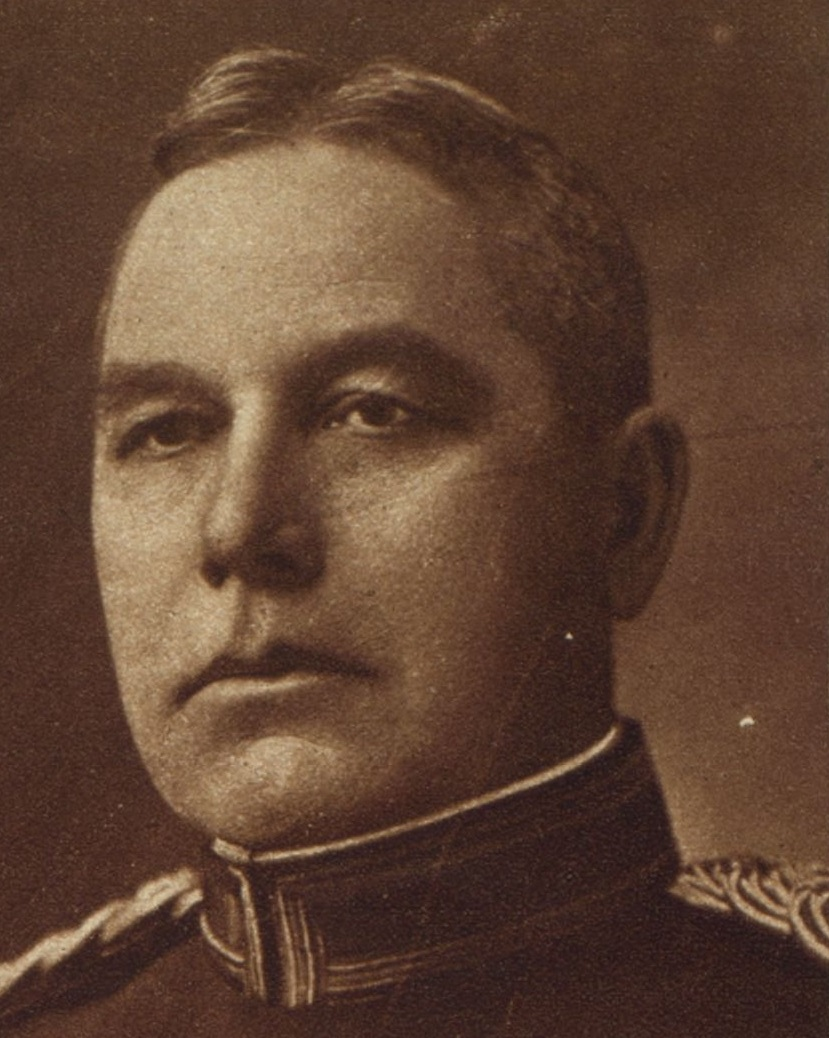
From 1919's The War of the Nations: Portfolio in Rotogravure Etchings

The 91st Division was demobilized in early 1919. Johnston returned briefly to the Army War College's General Staff before deploying once more to Germany in 1920 as part of the American forces occupying Germany. Over the next three years, Johnston played key roles in the occupying force, including chief of staff of American Forces in Germany until 1921, commanding officer of the 1st Brigade until 1922 and as general liaison officer to the French Army of the Rhine until 1923.

Johnston returned to the U.S. in 1923 to command the Fourth Coast Artillery District at Fort McPherson, Georgia. The following year, he assumed command of the 3rd Infantry Division, which he led until his retirement in 1925.

== Family ==
In June 1888, Johnston married Lucille Barat Wilkinson (1869–1917), a great-granddaughter of Major General James Wilkinson. (Note: Lucille Wilkinson's ancestry was James Wilkinson (1757–1825) (great-grandfather), Walter Wilkinson (1791–1837) (grandfather), Joseph Pratte Wilkinson (1822–1891) (father).) In 1923, Johnston married Isabelle Gros in Paris, France.

With his first wife, Johnston was the father of a daughter, Genevieve. Genevieve Johnston lived in St. Louis, and became a nun at Villa Duchesne Convent of the Sacred Heart in St. Louis.

== Retirement and death ==
In retirement, Johnston resided in Nice, France. He died in Nice on February 19, 1933, after he suffered a heart attack while attending a Red Cross ball. A memorial service was held in the chapel at Walter Reed Army Medical Center. He was buried at Arlington National Cemetery, and the honorary pallbearers included generals Stephen O. Fuqua, Harry L. Gilchrist, Samuel Hof, Lytle Brown, John W. Gulick, and Oscar Westover.
