= New Philadelphia, Indiana =

- Unincorporated community
- Washington County's location in Indiana

- Location of New Philadelphia in Washington County
- Coordinates: 38°37′36″N 85°58′13″W
- Country: United States
- State: Indiana
- County: Washington
- Township: Franklin
- Elevation: 935 ft (285 m)
- Time zone: UTC-5 (Eastern (EST))
  - Summer (DST): UTC-4 (EDT)
- ZIP code: 47167
- Area codes: 812, 930
- GNIS feature ID: 440097

New Philadelphia is an unincorporated community in Franklin Township, Washington County, in the U.S. state of Indiana.

== History ==
New Philadelphia was originally called Philadelphia, and under the latter name was laid out in 1837.

A post office was established at New Philadelphia in 1833, and remained in operation until it was discontinued in 1938.

== Geography ==
New Philadelphia is located at 38°37′36″N 85°58′13″W.

== Notable people ==
- John M. Bloss 1860, third President of Oregon State University, was born in New Philadelphia.
