= John Letcher =

American politician (1813-1884)

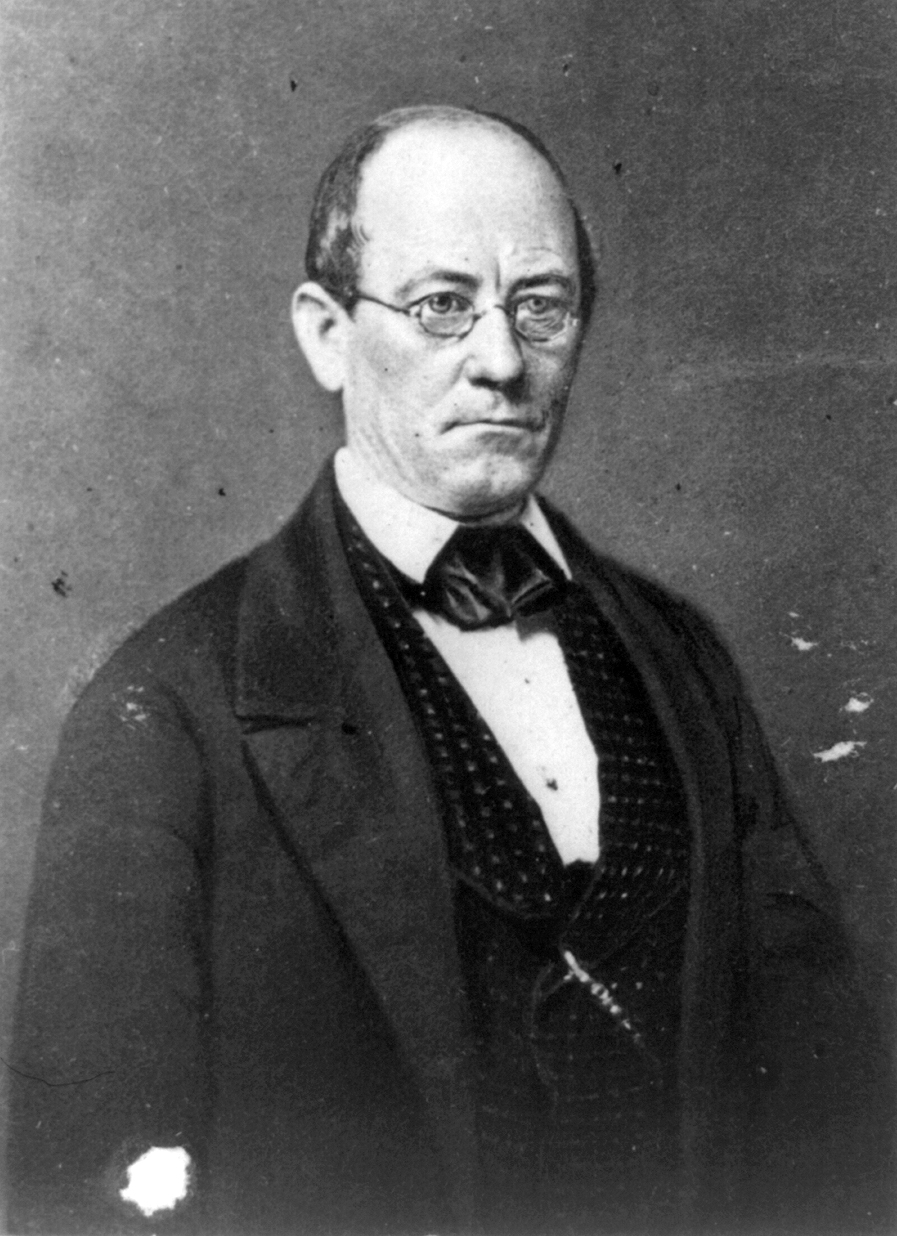

34th Governor of Virginia
- In office January 1, 1860 – January 1, 1864 (disputed from 1861)
- Lieutenant: Robert Latane Montague
- Preceded by: Henry A. Wise
- Succeeded by: William Smith (Confederate); Francis Pierpont (Unionist)

Member of the Virginia House of Delegates from Rockbridge County
- In office December 1, 1875 – December 5, 1877 Serving with W. B. F. Leech

Member of the U.S. House of Representatives from Virginia
- In office March 4, 1851 – March 3, 1859
- Preceded by: James McDowell
- Succeeded by: John T. Harris
- Constituency: 11th district (1851‍–‍1853); 9th district (1853‍–‍1859)

Personal details
- Born: March 29, 1813 Lexington, Virginia, U.S.
- Died: January 26, 1884 (aged 70) Virginia, U.S.
- Resting place: Oak Grove Cemetery
- Party: Democratic
- Spouse: Susan Holt
- Children: 11, including Samuel, John, and Greenlee
- Occupation: Politician; lawyer; journalist

John Letcher (March 29, 1813 – January 26, 1884) was an American lawyer, journalist, and politician. He served as a Representative in the United States Congress, was the 34th Governor of Virginia during the American Civil War, and later served in the Virginia General Assembly. He was also active on the Board of Visitors of Virginia Military Institute.

== Biography ==
=== Early life ===
John Letcher was born in the town of Lexington in Rockbridge County, Virginia. He attended private rural schools and Randolph-Macon College in Boydton, Virginia (later relocated to Ashland, Virginia). In 1833, he graduated from Washington Academy in Lexington. He studied law, was admitted to the Virginia State Bar, and opened a practice in Lexington in 1839.

=== Career ===
Letcher was editor of the (Shenandoah) Valley Star newspaper from 1840 to 1850. He was active in the presidential campaigns of 1840, 1844, and 1848, serving as a Democratic elector in 1848. Although never a true abolitionist, he signed the Ruffner Pamphlet of 1847, which proposed the abolition of slavery in that part of Virginia west of the Blue Ridge Mountains; however, he soon repudiated this antislavery stand. He was a delegate to the Virginia Constitutional Convention of 1850.

He was elected as a Democratic candidate and served as a Representative in the United States Congress from 1851 to 1859. In Congress, he was known as "Honest John" because of his opposition to government extravagance.

=== American Civil War ===
John Letcher was elected as Governor of Virginia in 1859, defeating Whig candidate William L. Goggin, and served from 1860 to 1864. According to the Anti-Slavery Bugle:

In accepting the nomination he states "in language distinct and emphatic, that he regards the institution of slavery, existing in Virginia and other slave States, as morally, socially and politically right." Years ago Mr. Letcher was less decided in his convictions as to the blessings of slavery. He is even charged with having been an abolitionist.

Letcher was prominent in the organization of the Peace Conference of 1861 that met in Washington, D.C., on February 8, 1861, to devise means to prevent the impending American Civil War. He discouraged secession but actively sustained the ordinance passed by Virginia on April 17, 1861. Despite scheduling a popular vote to determine whether Virginia would declare secession from the United States, ultimately, the actions of the Virginia Secession Convention of 1861 and the state government, especially Letcher, effectively led Virginia to declare secession from the United States. The referendum occurred on May 23, 1861, and Virginia voters overwhelmingly approved the Articles of Secession. Letcher appointed Robert E. Lee, who had just resigned as a colonel in the U.S. Army, as commander in chief of Virginia's army and navy forces on April 22, 1861, at the grade of major general. On April 24, 1861, Virginia and the Confederate States agreed that the Virginia forces would be under the overall direction of Confederate President Jefferson Davis, pending completion of the process of Virginia joining the Confederate States.

Colonel John Brown Baldwin defeated Letcher in May 1863 for a seat in the Second Confederate Congress. In 1864, his home in Lexington was burned by Union troops during General David Hunter's raid.

=== Postwar ===
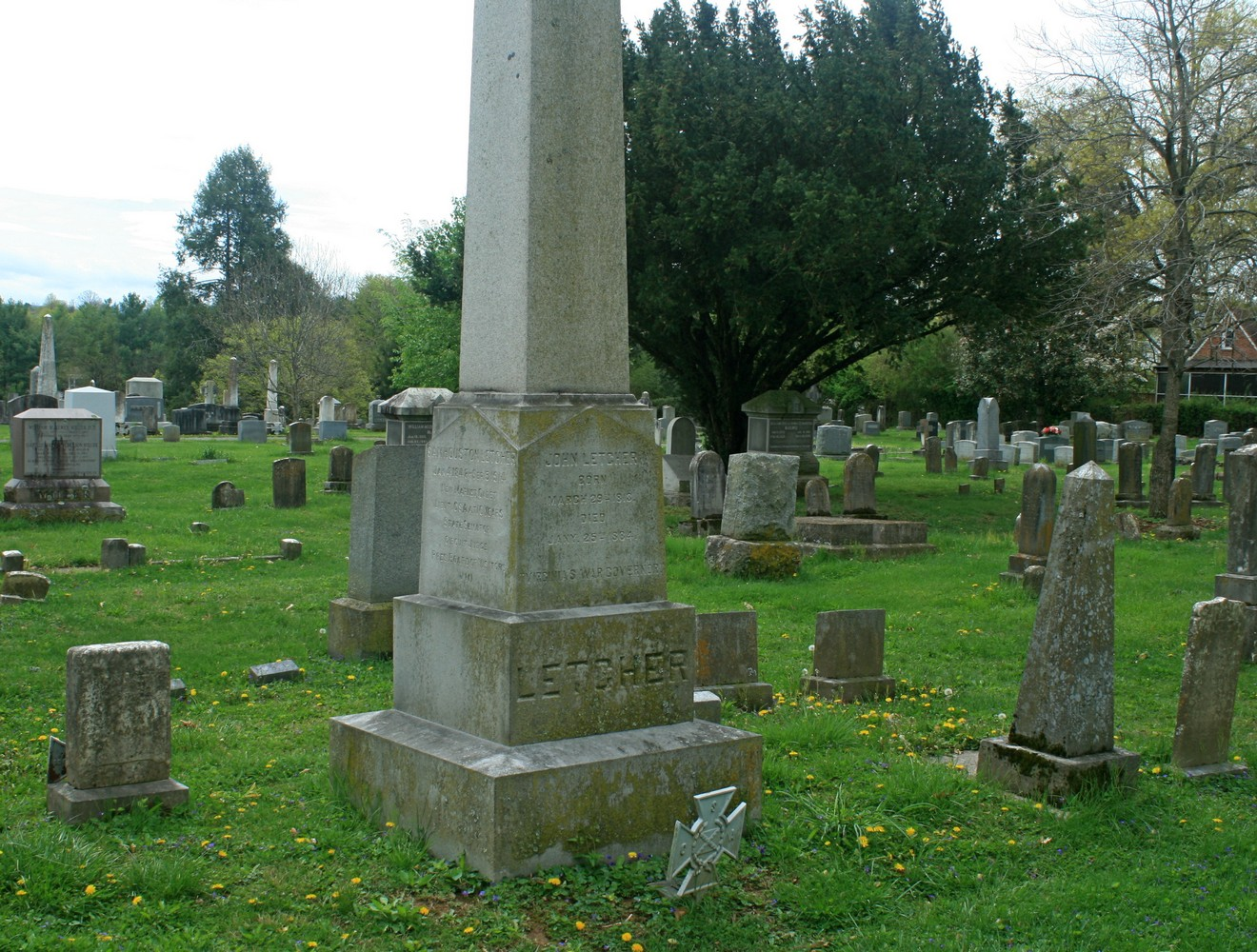
The tomb of John Letcher at Oak Grove Cemetery (Lexington)

After the Civil War, Letcher resumed the practice of law in Lexington. He was elected as a member of the House of Delegates in the Virginia General Assembly 1875–1877. He was a member of the Board of Visitors of the Virginia Military Institute (VMI) 1866–1880 and served as president of the Board for ten years.

He died on January 26, 1884, at the age of 70, and was interred in the Presbyterian Cemetery (now Oak Grove Cemetery) at Lexington, Virginia.

=== Electoral history ===
1859 – Letcher was elected Governor of Virginia, defeating American William Leftwich Goggin.

=== Family ===
Among Letcher's sons was Samuel Houston Letcher, a state senator and judge; John Davidson Letcher, a professor at Oregon State University who serving as acting president from January 1892 to June 1892; and Greenlee D. Letcher, a two-term member of the Virginia House of Delegates. Governor Letcher had a daughter, Lizzie, who married James Harrison, a language professor at Washington and Lee and later head of the Romance and Teutonic Language Department at the University of Virginia after 1895.

Party political offices
Preceded by Henry A. Wise	Democratic nominee for Governor of Virginia; 1859	Vacant Title next held by Gilbert Carlton Walker
U.S. House of Representatives
Preceded by James McDowell	Member of the U.S. House of Representatives from Virginia's 11th congressional district March 4, 1851 – March 3, 1853	Succeeded by John F. Snodgrass
Preceded by James F. Strother	Member of the U.S. House of Representatives from Virginia's 9th congressional district March 4, 1853 – March 3, 1859	Succeeded by John T. Harris
Political offices
Preceded by Henry A. Wise	Undisputed Governor of Virginia; 1860–1861	Succeeded by Himself as Confederate Governor
Preceded by Henry A. Wise	Undisputed Governor of Virginia; 1860–1861	Succeeded by Francis Harrison Pierpont as Unionist Governor
Preceded by Himself as the Undisputed Governor	Confederate Governor of Virginia; 1861–1864	Succeeded by William Smith
