= Joseph Emery =

American academic

- Emery circa 1885
- Born: June 2, 1833; Pennsylvania, U.S.
- Died: January 18, 1924 (aged 90); Salinas, California, U.S.

Academic work
- Discipline: Mathematics; Physics; Geology; Physiology
- Institutions: Corvallis College

Joseph Emery (June 2, 1833 – January 18, 1924) was an American academic and an acting president of Corvallis College, known today as Oregon State University. He taught at Corvallis College from 1867 to 1885.

== Corvallis College ==
Joseph Emery was born in Pennsylvania on June 2, 1833. Joining the Corvallis College faculty in 1867, he taught mathematics, physics, geology, and physiology. He was elected as the school's librarian in 1870. Afterward, William Asa Finley, who had then served as Corvallis College's first president since 1865, resigned in June 1872, as a result of which Emery became an acting president of Corvallis College and the faculty head from May 5 to August 30, 1872.

Although Emery served as acting president of the school but briefly, he is credited for having installed the first college courses targeted to women.

Benjamin Lee Arnold succeeded Emery's presidency in September, 1872. Despite the short period of his incumbency, as a president he submitted the first biennial report of Corvallis College to the Governor of Oregon.

== Later career ==
In 1885, Emery left Corvallis to become an agent for the U.S. Indian Agency at Klamath.

Emery later moved to San Jose, California and became a pastor in the Methodist Episcopal Church.

He died in Salinas, California on January 18, 1924.
