= George W. Peavy =

American forester and academic administrator

Mayor of Corvallis, Oregon (1947–48, 1951)

Personal details
- Born: November 12, 1869 Howell, Michigan
- Died: June 24, 1951 (aged 81) Corvallis, Oregon
- Party: Republican
- Education: University of Michigan (BS 1895, MS 1905)
- Profession: professor, administrator, politician

George Wilcox Peavy (November 12, 1869 – June 24, 1951) was an American forester and academic administrator in the American state of Oregon. Peavy was the eleventh president of Oregon State College, today's Oregon State University, serving in that capacity from 1932 to 1940. He also served as mayor of Corvallis, Oregon from 1947 to 1948 and formally in 1951, leading efforts to reorganize city government and greatly expand city services during his tenure.

A former professor of forestry at OSC, Peavy is the namesake of Peavy Arboretum, the school's demonstration forest.

== Biography ==
=== Early years ===
George Peavy was born November 12, 1869, near Howell, Michigan. He attended the University of Michigan from 1890 to 1895, studying both literature and forestry. He married the former Leona Bradley in 1894; together the couple would raise three sons.

Peavy initially worked as a school principal, heading high schools in Jackson and Flint, Michigan.

He also worked for a short time as a newspaper editor before returning to the University of Michigan to pursue a master's degree in forestry, which he earned in 1905. He then took a position with the United States Forest Service in 1904, for which he worked until 1910 as chief of planting for the states of California and Nevada. Peavy would successfully defend his doctorate degree in 1936.

=== Collegiate career ===
In February 1910, Peavy was appointed as a professor of forestry at Oregon Agricultural College, today's Oregon State University, to fill a vacancy left by the resignation of professor E.R. Lake.

Through Peavy's volition, the Oregon State School of Forestry launched an arboretum and demonstration forest in 1925, which was named for Peavy in 1926. Peavy Arboretum grew significantly over time, eventually encompassing several thousand acres through the donation of Mary J.L. McDonald of San Francisco.

In September 1932, OSC President William Jasper Kerr was named the first chancellor of the Oregon State System of Higher Education, and Peavy was named his successor, becoming the seventh president of the college. Peavy would remain both dean of the forestry department and president of OSC until his retirement in 1940. He held the title president emeritus for the rest of his life.

=== Political career ===
Peavy was the chair of Benton County Red Cross. During World War II, Peavy was named civil defense coordinator for Benton County, Oregon.

Peavy was elected mayor of Corvallis in November 1946 and took office in January 1947. Peavy was elected by his mayoral peers as president of the League of Oregon Cities in 1948. He declined to run for a second two-year term as mayor of Corvallis in that same year, however.

Peavy was a charter member of the Corvallis Rotary Club, served as its president for a term, and was a district governor of Rotary International. He was also a Scottish Rite Mason and a member of Shriners International.

In January 1950, the 81-year-old Republican filed paperwork to run for a second term of office in the forthcoming May primary election. Peavy easily captured the Republican nomination and won election to his second term in the fall.

Despite an easy election victory assuring Peavy of a second term in November 1950, health issues would intervene. In the middle of Christmas night, December 25–26, 1950, Peavy was stricken by a serious stroke which left his right side paralyzed and impaired his speech. Peavy was not hospitalized in the aftermath but remained at home under a nurse's care.

Peavy make incremental progress following the stroke but remained bedridden. His speech gradually returned and he became able to sit up for short periods each day but he did not resign as mayor of Corvallis, which was run by a strong city manager form of government, instead expressing hope to the city council that he would be able to resume his governmental activity shortly.

=== Death and legacy ===
Peavy died in Corvallis on June 24, 1951. He was 81 years old at the time of his death.

During his final illness, Peavy was honored with a lengthy editorial in his hometown daily newspaper, the Corvallis Gazette-Times. The editorialist credited Peavy during his time as mayor of Corvallis as being the "driving force" behind the reorganization of city government from a strong mayor system to the council-city manager model. The city's police and fire departments, recorder's department, and engineering department were said to have been brought under unitary control under the new system, with greater economic efficiency resulting. Peavy was also lauded for launching a program that saw the paving of 194 blocks of city streets and 24 blocks of alleys, thereby "lifting Corvallis out of the mud."

Peavy was also credited for working to establish a new $100,000 city swimming pool for youth recreation and a 4 million gallon river water filtration plant, to ensure an adequate drinking water supply into the future. A new sewage treatment plant was scheduled for completion in 1952, thanks in measure to Peavy's efforts, the editorialist noted. Street and traffic lights were also expanded and improved under Peavy's watch, it was asserted.

Peavy's papers are housed at Oregon State University in the OSU Archives.

Academic offices
Preceded by William Jasper Kerr	President of Oregon State University; 1932–1940	Succeeded by Frank Llewellyn Ballard
