= Peavy Arboretum =

Arboretum in Corvallis, Oregon, United States

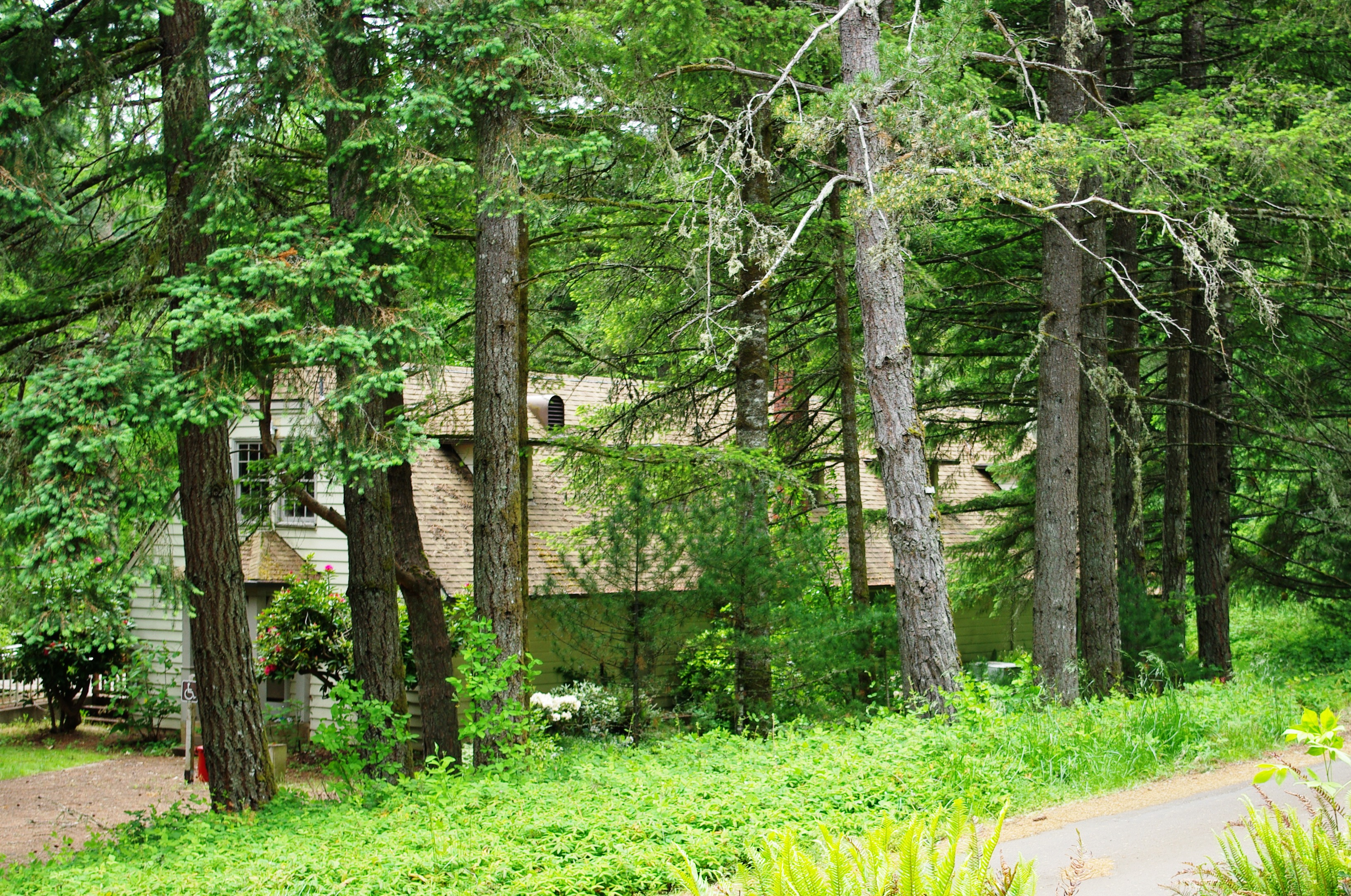
- Lodge at Peavy

- Location within Oregon Location within the United States
- Type: Arboretum
- Location: Corvallis, Oregon, United States
- Coordinates: 44°39′24″N 123°13′56″W
- Area: 40-acre (16 ha)
- Operator: Oregon State University
- Status: Open to the public
- Website: Official website

Peavy Arboretum (40 acres) is an arboretum operated by Oregon State University and located on Arboretum Road, Corvallis, Oregon. The arboretum is open to the public daily without charge.

The arboretum was dedicated by the university in 1926, operated as a Civilian Conservation Corps (CCC) camp from 1933–1942, and reverted to College of Forestry management in 1964. While the CCC was active, they planted trees, expanded the nursery, constructed Cronemiller Lake, and built roads, trails, and firebreaks.

The arboretum is named for George W. Peavy (1869–1951), the head of the OAC forestry department at the time of foundation.

== Plants ==
Today the arboretum includes a variety of native and exotic woody plants, including:

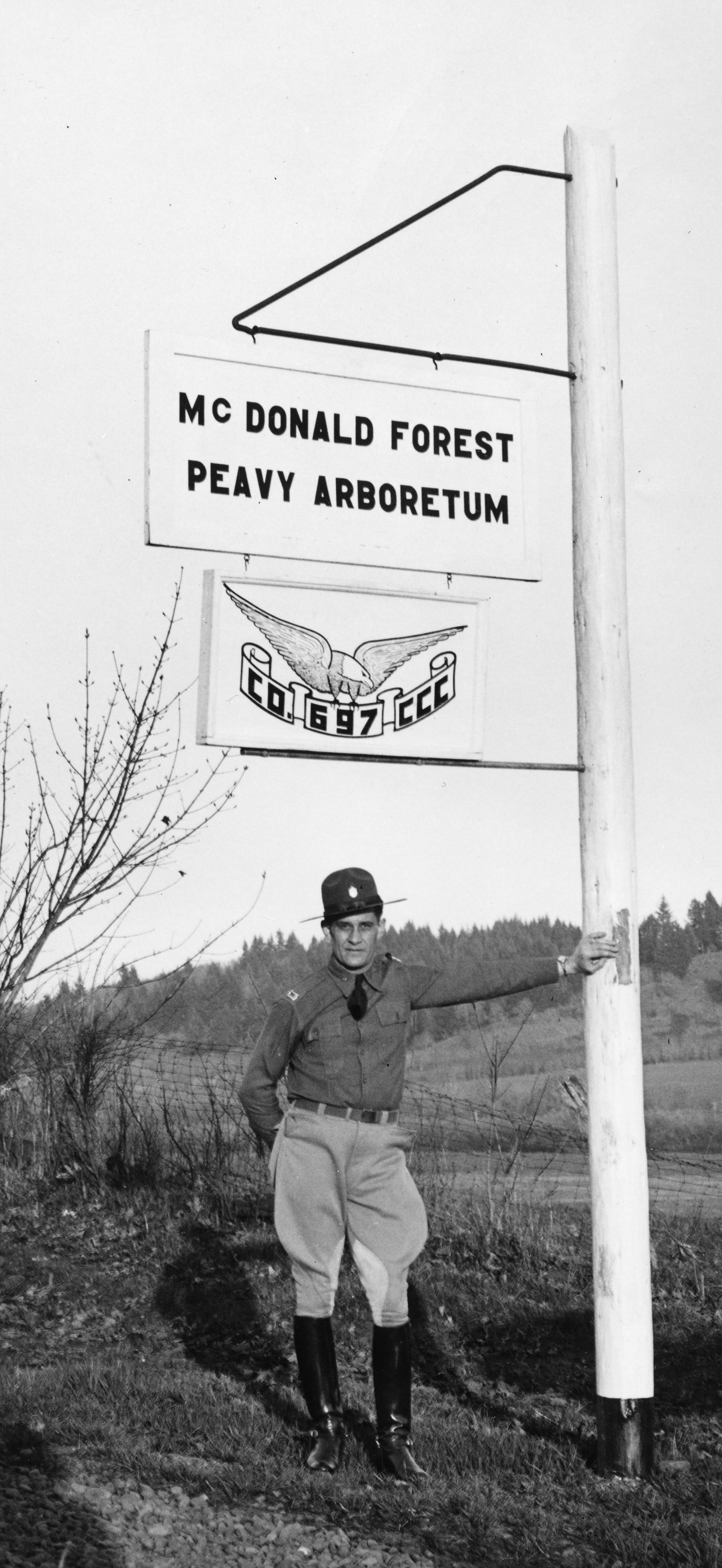
Civilian Conservation Corps Camp sign.

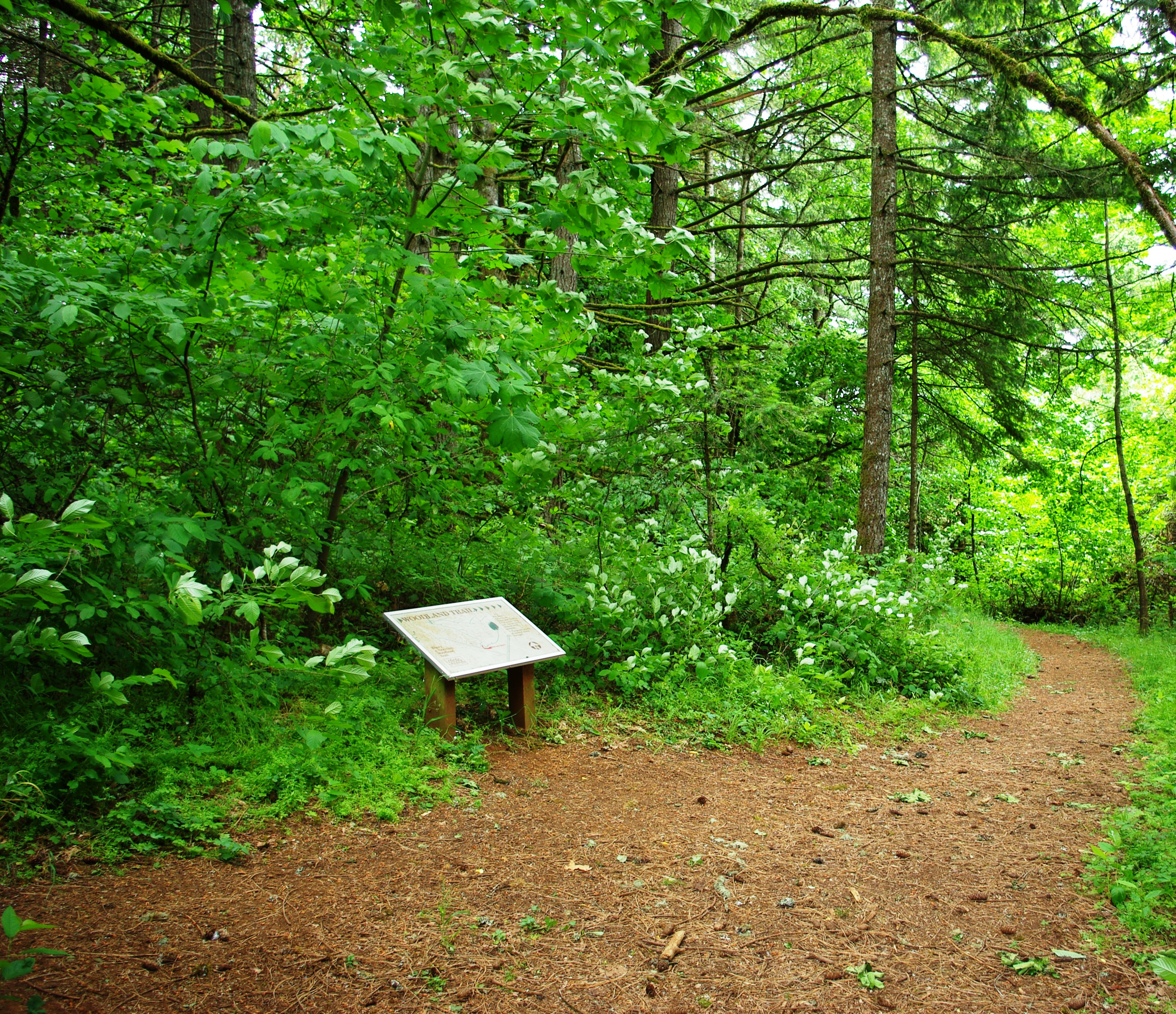
Trail and sign at Peavy

- Abies alba
- Abies bracteata
- Abies cephalonica
- Abies cilicica
- Abies concolor
- Abies grandis
- Abies lasiocarpa
- Abies magnifica
- Abies magnifica var. shastensis
- Abies pinsapo
- Abies procera
- Acer grosseri
- Acer macrophyllum
- Acer platanoides
- Acer saccharum
- Aesculus sp.
- Alnus incana
- Alnus japonica
- Alnus rhombifolia
- Alnus rubra
- Amelanchier alnofolia
- Arbutus menziesii
- Arctostaphylos patula
- Baccharis piluaris
- Berberis aquifolium
- Berberis nervosa
- Betula occidentalis
- Betula pendula
- Calocedrus decurrens
- Carpinus caroliniana
- Castanea dentate
- Cercidiphyllum japonicum
- Cedrus deodara
- Cedrus libani
- Cercocarpus betutoides
- Cercocarpus montanus
- Chamaecyparis lawsoniana
- Chamaecyparis nootkatensis
- Chamaecyparis obtuse
- Comas nuttalii
- Cornus florida
- Cornus stolonifera var. occidentalis
- Corylus avellana
- Corylus colurna
- Corylus cornuta
- Crataegus douglasii
- Cupressus arizonica
- Cupressus bakeri
- Cupressus macnabiana
- Cupressus macrocarpa
- Cupressus sargentiana
- Cupressus sempervirens
- Cupressus sp.
- Forsythia sp.
- Fraxinus latifolia
- Garrya elliptica
- Gaultheria shallon
- Holodiscus discolor
- Hypericum sp.
- Ilex aquifolium
- Juglans nigra
- Juniperus occidentails
- Juniperus rigida
- Juniperus sp.
- Juniperus virginiana
- Larix dahurica
- Larix occidentalis
- Larix sp.
- Ligustrum sp.
- Lonicera sp.
- Malus sp.
- Metasequoia glyptostroboides
- Myrica californica
- Myrica pensylvanica
- Oemleria cerasiformis
- Ostrya carpinifolia
- Physocarpus capitatus
- Picea engelmannii
- Picea glauca
- Picea pungens
- Picea sitchensis
- Pinus aristata
- Pinus attenu radiate
- Pinus attenuate
- Pinus backsiana
- Pinus contorta
- Pinus contorta var. latifolia
- Pinus coulteri
- Pinus densiflora
- Pinus enchinata
- Pinus jeffreyi
- Pinus jeffreyi var. coulteri
- Pinus monticola
- Pinus muricata
- Pinus nigra
- Pinus peuce
- Pinus pinaster
- Pinus ponderosa
- Pinus resinosa
- Pinus sabiniana
- Pinus sp.
- Pinus strobes
- Pinus sylvestris
- Pinus thunbergii
- Populus alba
- Populus deltoids
- Populus trichocarpa
- Prunus Americana
- Prunus emarginata
- Prunus serotina
- Prunus sp.
- Prunus virginiana
- Pseudotsuga menziesii
- Pseudotsuga menziesii var. glauca
- Pyrus communis
- Pyrus fusca
- Pyrus malus
- Quercus chrysolepis
- Quercus garryana
- Quercus kelloggii
- Quercus velutina
- Rhamnus purshiana
- Rhododendron macrophyllum
- Rhododendron sp.
- Rhododendron sp.
- Rhus diversiloba
- Ribes lobbii
- Robinia pseudoacaia
- Rosa sp.
- Rosa woodsii
- Rubus discolor
- Rubus laciniatus
- Rubus parviflorus
- Rubus ursinus
- Salix sp.
- Sambucus cerulean
- Sequoia sempervirens
- Sequoiadendron giganteum
- Sorbus aucuparia
- Spiraea douglasii
- Styrax japonica
- Symphoricarpos albus
- Taxus brevifolia
- Thuja occidentalis
- Thuja plicata
- Torreya californica
- Tsuga heterophylla
- Tsuga mertensiana
- Ulmus pumila
- Vaccinium ovatum
- Vaccinium parvifolium

Specimens are mapped and clearly labeled.

== See also ==
- List of botanical gardens in the United States
