= H. B. Miller =

American politician and newspaperman (1819–1889)

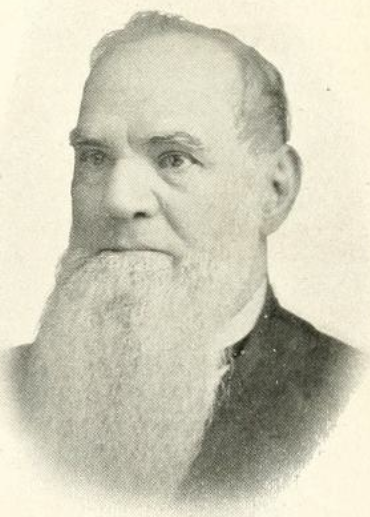
- Miller in 1901 publication

Personal details
- Born: April 16, 1819 Lebanon County, Pennsylvania, U.S.
- Died: November 19, 1889 (aged 70) Chicago, Illinois, U.S.
- Resting place: South Bend City Cemetery; South Bend, Indiana, U.S.
- Party: Whig; Republican
- Spouse: Esther Bowman (m. 1840)
- Relations: William Miller (brother)
- Children: 6
- Occupation: Politician; newspaperman
- Nickname: "Buffalo" Miller

H. B. Miller (April 16, 1819 – November 19, 1889) was a politician and newspaperman. He organized the Republican in Niles, Michigan, Michigan Telegraph in Kalamazoo, Michigan and the Buffalo Telegraph in Buffalo, New York. He served as a member of the New York Senate and the Illinois House of Representatives.

== Early life ==
H. B. Miller was born on April 16, 1819, in Lebanon County, Pennsylvania, to Henry Miller. At the age of fourteen, Miller learned the printer's trade at a printer office in his hometown. At the age of seventeen, Miller and his family moved to St. Joseph County, Indiana, where he worked in The Free Press office under Wilbur F. Storey. His brother was William Miller.

== Career ==
In 1839, Miller moved to Niles, Michigan, and established Republican, a weekly paper and helped organize the Whig Party. In 1840, Miller worked as a lighthouse inspector for the lakes under Harrison. In 1844, Miller sold the paper and moved to Kalamazoo, Michigan, where he founded the Michigan Telegraph. In 1845, Miller left the paper and moved to Buffalo, New York, to establish the Buffalo Telegraph, the second German newspaper published in the United States. He worked with the paper for fourteen years.

After leaving the Buffalo Telegraph, Miller secured a contract to line telegraph from Quebec to Montreal. Afterward, he secured a contract to deepen and widen the Erie Canal to Black Rock, Buffalo. Miller was elected to the New York Senate, representing the Buffalo district. He served for two terms, served until 1865. In 1865, Miller moved to Chicago. Miller was a Republican. He served in the Illinois House of Representatives for one term. He was appointed treasurer of Cook County, Illinois. He served as treasurer for one term.

Miller opened a brewery in Chicago. He also purchased a distillery owned by Jacob Bunn. Miller was arrested due to his connection with the Whiskey Ring. He then retired and moved to South Bend, Indiana. In 1888, Miller was nominated for Mayor of South Bend, but lost the election. According to his obituary, he lost due to his whiskey interests.

== Personal life ==
Miller married Esther Bowman in 1840. They had six children, including three that died in infancy, Katherine, W. H. Jr. and Clara.

Miller was given the nickname "Buffalo" Miller since he often spoke about his time in Buffalo.

Miller died at Grand Pacific Hotel on November 19, 1889, following a surgical operation for Bright's disease. He was buried in the family lot at South Bend City Cemetery.
