= Thomas M. Gatch =

American politician (1833–1913)

Thomas Milton Gatch

2nd President of Willamette University
- In office 1860–1865
- Preceded by: Francis S. Hoyt
- Succeeded by: Leonard J. Powell
- In office 1870–1879
- Preceded by: Nelson Rounds
- Succeeded by: Charles E. Lambert

President of the University of Washington
- In office 1887–1895
- Preceded by: Leonard Jackson Powell
- Succeeded by: Mark Walrod Harrington

President of Oregon State University
- In office 1897–1907
- Preceded by: Henry B. Miller
- Succeeded by: William Jasper Kerr

Personal details
- Born: January 28, 1833 Milford, Ohio
- Died: April 22, 1913 (aged 80) Seattle, Washington
- Children: Claud Gatch
- Education: Ohio Wesleyan University; DePauw University
- Profession: educator
- Willamette University info

Thomas Milton Gatch (January 28, 1833 – April 22, 1913) was an American pioneer educator on the Pacific Coast. He served one term as mayor of Salem, Oregon, was the president of what would become Oregon State University, served as the 10th president of the University of Washington, and twice served as president of Willamette University. A native of Ohio, he was the first president of Oregon State University to hold a doctorate degree.

== Early life ==
Thomas Gatch was born in the town of Milford, Ohio, to Lucinda and Thomas Gatch. In Ohio, Gatch attended Ohio Wesleyan University where he graduated with a Bachelor of Arts degree in 1855. He then moved to Cincinnati, where he took a course at Lane Theological Seminary, and was later awarded an honorary Doctor of Divinity degree from the school.

In 1856 Gatch moved west to California, where he mined gold during the California Gold Rush and also taught school for three years. He then taught at the University of the Pacific at Santa Clara, California. At Pacific he served as chair of the natural sciences and mathematics department.

He was married in 1857 to Orytha Bennett, and they would have five children including Claude Gatch, a future mayor of Salem, Oregon.

== Administrative career ==
=== Early positions ===
Gatch's career in academia began in 1856, when he worked as a professor of natural science at California Wesleyan College (today's University of the Pacific) in Santa Clara, California. He was named principal of Santa Cruz public schools the following year. In 1858 he returned to California Wesleyan, where he was employed one year as professor of mathematics and one year as professor of ancient literature.

In 1860, Gatch was named president of Willamette University in Salem, where he served until the end of the 1865-66 academic year. He returned to the position as president of the school, serving from 1870 until 1879. During this time Thomas Gatch then earned a Doctor of Philosophy in 1874 from Indiana Asbury University (now DePauw University). He also served as mayor of Salem from 1877 to 1878.

Gatch returned to his position as president of Santa Cruz public schools in 1866 before moving to Portland, Oregon to become principal of Portland Academy in 1867, where he would remain until 1870.

In 1870, Gatch was tapped again as president of Willamette University, where he would remain for a decade.

In 1881, Gatch helped found the Wasco Independent Academy in The Dalles, Oregon, at which he served as principal through the 1886-87 academic year.

=== University of Washington ===
Gatch was then selected to serve as president of the University of Washington in Seattle in 1887. He left that position in 1895.

=== Oregon Agricultural College ===
In 1897 Gatch was named president of Oregon Agricultural College (OAC, today's Oregon State University), becoming the first chief of the school to hold a doctorate degree.

OAC's armory and gymnasium was completed during the 1899-1900 academic year and is today serves as the Gladys Valley Gymnastics Center.

At the time of his arrival, OAC employed 27 members of the faculty, in charge of a student body of 336. The school grew substantially over the next decade, counting 833 students and a faculty of 41 by the 1906-07 academic year, Gatch's last at the school. The college also grew structurally, with a new heating plant, armory and gymnasium, agricultural building, and women's dormitory constructed at OAC during Gatch's time at the helm.

Gatch oversaw a tightening of academic rigor at the school, with the discontinuation of three-year degree courses. New degree programs in mining (1900–01) and literary commerce (1901–02) were introduced, and a department of music re-established. A 20-minute daily chapel session was held, at which announcements were made and Gatch and various prominent citizens frequently spoke.

Gatch was regarded as a friend of intercollegiate athletics, campus sports, dancing and social events, literary societies, and competitive debate. He was instrumental in the re-establishment of intercollegiate sport in the fall of 1901 following a controversial ban of such activity by the OAC Board of Regents at their annual meeting ahead of the 1900-01 academic year.

Gatch remained at OAC through the end of the 1906-07 academic year, though he came back as the head of the department of political and mental science in the fall of 1907. Through the recommendation of OAC Board of Regents, Gatch had previously been awarded a $1,000 annual pension upon his future retirement by the Carnegie Foundation for the Advancement of Teaching late in 1906, but with a one-year running clock to accept the offer he chose to abruptly call a close to his academic career in November 1907.

== Later years ==
After leaving Oregon State in 1907, he returned to Washington state.

In the spring of 1913, the 80-year old Gatch was stricken by "valvular heart trouble." His condition deteriorated and he was forced to remain confined to his home in the Queen Anne district in Seattle. Given little chance of recovery by physicians, Gatch died at home at 5 pm on April 22, 1913.

Academic offices
Preceded by Francis S. Hoyt	President of Willamette University; 1860–1865	Succeeded by Leonard J. Powell (interim); Joseph Henry Wythe
Preceded by Nelson Rounds	President of Willamette University; 1870–1879	Succeeded by Charles E. Lambert
Preceded by Leonard Jackson Powell	President of the University of Washington; 1887–1895	Succeeded by Mark Walrod Harrington
Preceded by Henry B. Miller	President of Oregon State University; 1897–1907	Succeeded by William Jasper Kerr
