= John M. Bloss =

Union American Civil War veteran and college president

3rd President of Oregon State University
- In office 1892–1896
- Preceded by: Benjamin Lee Arnold; John Davidson Letcher (interim)
- Succeeded by: Henry B. Miller

Personal details
- Born: January 21, 1839 New Philadelphia, Indiana
- Died: April 26, 1905 (aged 66)
- Resting place: Muncie, Indiana
- Education: Hanover College (A.B.)
- Military career
- Allegiance: United States of America
- Branch: United States Army
- Service years: 1861-1864
- Unit: 27th Indiana Infantry Regiment
- Conflicts: American Civil War; Battle of Antietam; Battle of Chancellorsville; Battle of Gettysburg
- Other work: school administrator, educator

John McKnight Bloss (January 21, 1839 – April 26, 1905) was an American Civil War soldier who had an influence on the Battle of Antietam and was later President of Oregon Agricultural College (now Oregon State University) from 1892 until 1896.

== Early life and education ==
He was born in New Philadelphia, Indiana in 1839.

Bloss attended Hanover College in Indiana from 1854 and earned an A.B. degree with honors in 1860. After his military service in the Civil War, he studied medicine at Ohio Medical College in Cincinnati, Ohio in 1865.

== American Civil War ==
Bloss fought on the Union side with the 27th Indiana Infantry Regiment. He was one of the soldiers who helped recover Special Order 191, "Lee's Lost Dispatch", which provided detailed Confederate troop movements from General Robert E. Lee's plans, during the Battle of Antietam. This helped lead the Union to victory in the battle. Bloss fought and was wounded in several battles, including Antietam, before he resigned in 1864.

== Career in education ==
He was a teacher; a principal; superintendent of the Indiana city schools of Evansville (1875–80) and Muncie (1883–86) and of Topeka, Kansas (1886–92); and the State Superintendent for Public Instruction for Indiana (1880–82). In April 1892, Bloss was selected as the third president of Oregon State University, but retired in 1896 due to his failing health.

== Personal life ==
Bloss married Emma L. McPheeters in 1865. They had two children, Nannie and William (Will). After Emma died of typhoid in Topeka, Kansas. He remarried in 1893, after meeting Mary A. Wood while serving as OAC president.

Bloss died in 1905 and is buried in Muncie, Indiana.
