= William Jasper Kerr =

American academic

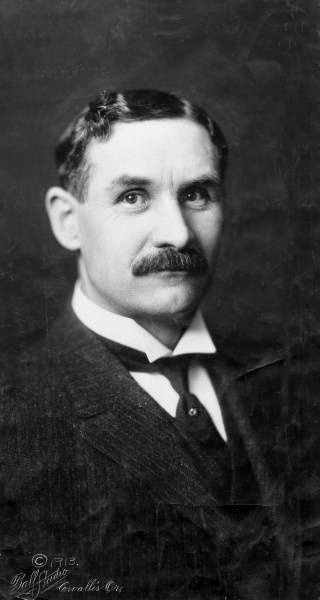
- Kerr in 1913

8th President of Oregon State University
- In office 1907–1932
- Preceded by: Thomas Milton Gatch
- Succeeded by: George Wilcox Peavy

4th President of Utah State University
- In office 1900–1907
- Preceded by: Joseph M. Tanner
- Succeeded by: John A. Widtsoe

Personal details
- Born: November 17, 1863 Richmond, Utah
- Died: April 15, 1947 (aged 83) Portland, Oregon
- Children: 6
- Education: University of Utah; Cornell University
- Profession: dean professor

William Jasper Kerr (November 17, 1863 – April 15, 1947) was an American academic in the states of Oregon and Utah. A native of Utah, he served as president of Oregon State University, known then as Oregon Agricultural College, Brigham Young College (not to be confused with Brigham Young University), and Utah State University, known then as Utah State Agricultural College. He later served as the first chancellor of what became the Oregon State Board of Higher Education, known then as the Oregon State Board of Higher Curricula. The administration building at Oregon State University is named in his honor.

== Early life and education ==
Kerr was born on November 17, 1863, in Richmond in the then Utah Territory. He received a bachelor's degree in Mathematics from the University of Utah in 1885. He planned to study law, and turned down appointment to West Point in order to go into law, but never did go into the profession. He married Leonora Hamilton in 1885, and had four daughters and two sons.

When he was 21 years old he worked as a manager for a mercantile company before entering the teaching profession as a teacher in Smithfield, Utah. Raised in the Church of Jesus Christ of Latter-day Saints (LDS Church) during the time when plural marriage (polygamy) was taught and practiced, Kerr later married a second wife, Lois Cordelia Morehead, a schoolteacher in Smithfield, Utah and they had two children, a son and a daughter. After the church renounced the practice, Kerr divorced his second wife in 1898. The emotional impact caused Kerr and his wives to leave the LDS Church.

Kerr served as a delegate to the Utah's constitutional conventions in both 1887 and 1895. He also studied at Cornell University in New York.

== Career ==
Kerr began his academic career in 1887 when he joined the faculty of Brigham Young University as a mathematics professor. He also taught at the University of Utah. He then served as president of Brigham Young College in Logan, Utah, from 1894 to 1900. In 1900, he left Brigham Young to become the president of Utah State University, also in Logan. Kerr left Utah State in 1907 and became the eighth president at Oregon State University (OSU), in Corvallis, Oregon. When he was considered for president of the university in 1907, the public animosity for Mormonism invited attacks on Kerr's polygamous past, until he reasserted his rejection of the faith.

He served as the president of OSU for 25 years, 1907 until 1932. As president, he oversaw a large expansion of the school, adding 23 buildings and growing the campus from 225 acres (91 ha) to 555 acres (225 ha). As part of the expansion he hired John C. Olmsted to draft a master plan for OSU's campus. In 1911, he was the president of the Association of Land Grant Colleges and Universities. Kerr left OSU in 1932 when he became the first chancellor of the Oregon State System of Higher Education serving in that position until 1935.

== Death and legacy ==
Following his retirement, Kerr moved to Portland, where he died on April 15, 1947, at the age of 83. The library at Oregon State University had been named in his honor, but after it was renamed as The Valley Library his name was added to the administration building.

Academic offices
Preceded by Joshua H. Paul	President of the Brigham Young College; 1894–1900	Succeeded by J. H. Linford
Preceded by Joseph M. Tanner	President of Utah State University; 1900–1907	Succeeded by John A. Widtsoe
Preceded by Thomas Milton Gatch	President of Oregon State University; 1907–1932	Succeeded by George Wilcox Peavy
