= Benjamin Lee Arnold =

American academic

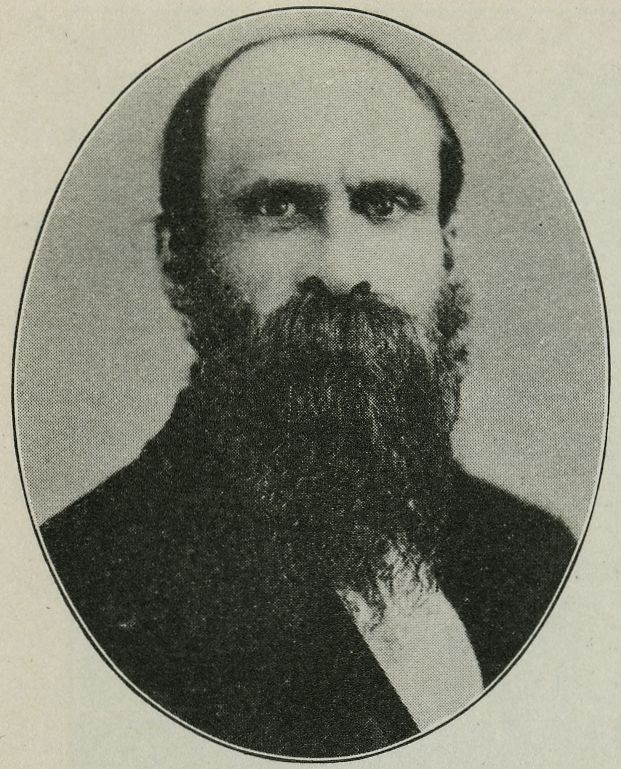

2nd President of Oregon State University
- In office 1872–1892
- Preceded by: Joseph Emery (acting)
- Succeeded by: John D. Letcher (acting)

Personal details
- Born: October 29, 1839 Mecklenburg, Virginia, U.S.
- Died: January 30, 1892 (aged 52) Corvallis, Oregon, U.S.
- Education: Randolph-Macon College

Military service
- Allegiance: Confederate States
- Branch/service: Confederate States Army
- Battles/wars: American Civil War

Benjamin Lee Arnold (October 29, 1839 - January 30, 1892) was an American academic and the second president of Oregon State University.

Benjamin Lee Arnold grew up in Mecklenburg County, Virginia. He received his B.S. from Randolph Macon College and taught in North Carolina, Tennessee, and Virginia. After graduating from Randolph-Macon College, he joined up with the Confederate States Army and served under General Robert E. Lee, he was discharged three months later because of a physical problem. After recovering, he started his career as a teacher.

Before coming to Oregon State University, he taught at several schools including West Tennessee College (now Union University) in Jackson and Virginia. In the summer of 1872, he was appointed as the president of Oregon State University by the bishops of the Methodist Episcopal Church, South, and came to Corvallis, Oregon, in September of the same year. As a Confederate veteran, arrived at the college "prepared to take charge of neglected military tactics as soon as arms arrived," and is credited with starting Oregon State University Army ROTC. He served in that capacity until his death on January 30, 1892.

He died on January 30, 1892, during his incumbency as a president there.
