= 2022 Pac-12 Conference women's basketball tournament =

- Classification: Division I
- Season: 2021–22
- Teams: 12
- Site: Michelob Ultra Arena; Las Vegas, NV
- Champions: Stanford (15th title)
- Winning coach: Tara VanDerveer (14th title)
- MVP: Haley Jones (Stanford)
- Attendance: 24,230
- Television: Pac-12 Network, ESPN2

2021–22 Pac-12 Conference women's basketball standings
	Conf.				Overall
Team	W		L	PCT	W		L	PCT
No. 2 Stanford †	16	–	0	1.000	32	–	4	.889
Oregon	11	–	6	.647	20	–	12	.625
Washington State	11	–	6	.647	19	–	11	.633
No. 19 Arizona	10	–	6	.625	21	–	8	.724
Colorado	9	–	7	.563	22	–	9	.710
Utah	8	–	7	.533	21	–	12	.636
UCLA	8	–	8	.500	18	–	13	.581
Oregon State	6	–	9	.400	17	–	14	.548
Arizona State	4	–	9	.308	12	–	14	.462
USC	5	–	12	.294	12	–	16	.429
California	2	–	10	.167	11	–	13	.458
Washington	2	–	12	.143	7	–	16	.304
† 2022 Pac-12 Tournament winner Rankings from AP poll

The 2022 Pac-12 Conference women's basketball tournament, presented by New York Life, was a postseason tournament held March 2–6, 2022, at Michelob Ultra Arena on the Las Vegas Strip in Paradise, Nevada. Stanford won their 15th Pac-12 title, receiving a bid to the 2022 NCAA tournament.

== Seeds ==
Seed	School	Conf.	Over.
#1	Stanford	16–0	25–3
#2	Oregon	11–6	19–10
#3	Washington State	11–6	19–9
#4	Arizona	10–6	20–6
#5	Colorado	9–7	20–7
#6	Utah	8–7	17–10
#7	UCLA	8–8	13–11
#8	Oregon State	6–9	13–12
#9	Arizona State	4–9	12–13
#10	USC	5–12	12–15
#11	California	2–10	11–12
#12	Washington	2–12	7–15

== Schedule ==
Session	Game	Time	Matchup	Television	Attendance
First Round – Wednesday, March 2
1	1	12:00 pm	#5 Colorado 64 vs. #12 Washington 52	P12N	3,044
1	2	2:30 pm	#8 Oregon State 59 vs. #9 Arizona State 54	P12N	3,044
2	3	6:00 pm	#7 UCLA 73 vs. #10 USC 60	P12N	3,010
2	4	8:30 pm	#6 Utah 66 vs. #11 California 60	P12N	3,010
Quarterfinals – Thursday, March 3
3	5	12:00 pm	#4 Arizona 43 vs. #5 Colorado 45	P12N	4,122
3	6	2:30 pm	#1 Stanford 57 vs. #8 Oregon State 44	P12N	4,122
4	7	6:00 pm	#2 Oregon 63 vs. #7 UCLA 60	P12N	4,428
4	8	8:30 pm	#3 Washington State 59 vs. #6 Utah 70	P12N	4,428
Semifinals – Friday, March 4
5	9	6:00 pm	#1 Stanford 71 vs. #5 Colorado 45	P12N	4,917
5	10	8:30 pm	#2 Oregon 73 vs. #6 Utah 80	P12N	4,917
Championship Game – Sunday, March 6
6	11	3:00 pm	#1 Stanford 73 vs. #6 Utah 48	ESPN2	4,709
Game times in PT. Rankings denote tournament seeds.

== Bracket ==
First round Wednesday, March 2 P12N
5	Colorado	64
12	Washington	52
8	Oregon State	59
9	Arizona State	54
7	UCLA	73
10	USC	60
6	Utah	66
11	California	60

Quarterfinals; Thursday, March 3 P12N
4	Arizona	43
5	Colorado	45
1	Stanford	57
8	Oregon State	44
2	Oregon	63
7	UCLA	60
3	Washington State	59
6	Utah	70

Semifinals; Friday, March 4 P12N
5	Colorado	45
1	Stanford	71
2	Oregon	73
6	Utah	80

Championship Game; Sunday, March 6 ESPN2
1	Stanford	73
6	Utah	48

Note: * denotes overtime

=== All-Tournament Team ===
Name	Pos.	Year	Team
Cameron Brink	F	So.	Stanford
Jenna Johnson	F	Fr.	Utah
Haley Jones	G	Jr.	Stanford
Gianna Kneepkens	G	Fr.	Utah
Nyara Sabally	F	R-Jr.	Oregon
Anna Wilson	G	GSr.	Stanford

=== Most Outstanding Player ===
Name	Pos.	Year	Team
Haley Jones	G	Jr.	Stanford

== See also ==
- 2022 Pac-12 Conference men's basketball tournament
