= 2021–22 USC Trojans women's basketball team =

Intercollegiate basketball season

2021–22 USC Trojans women's basketball
- Conference: Pac-12 Conference
- Record: 12–16 (5–12 Pac-12)
- Head coach: Lindsay Gottlieb (1st season)
- Assistant coaches: Danyelle Grant (1st season); Wendale Farrow (1st season); Nneka Enemkpali (1st season)
- Home arena: Galen Center

2021–22 Pac-12 Conference women's basketball standings
	Conf.				Overall
Team	W		L	PCT	W		L	PCT
No. 2 Stanford †	16	–	0	1.000	32	–	4	.889
Oregon	11	–	6	.647	20	–	12	.625
Washington State	11	–	6	.647	19	–	11	.633
No. 19 Arizona	10	–	6	.625	21	–	8	.724
Colorado	9	–	7	.563	22	–	9	.710
Utah	8	–	7	.533	21	–	12	.636
UCLA	8	–	8	.500	18	–	13	.581
Oregon State	6	–	9	.400	17	–	14	.548
Arizona State	4	–	9	.308	12	–	14	.462
USC	5	–	12	.294	12	–	16	.429
California	2	–	10	.167	11	–	13	.458
Washington	2	–	12	.143	7	–	16	.304
† 2022 Pac-12 Tournament winner Rankings from AP poll

The 2021–22 USC Trojans women's basketball team represented the University of Southern California during the 2021–22 NCAA Division I women's basketball season. The Trojans played their home games at the Galen Center and areweremembers of the Pac-12 Conference. The squad is led by first-year head coach Lindsay Gottlieb, who was hired on May 10, 2021. Prior to arriving at USC, Gottlieb served as an assistant coach for the Cleveland Cavaliers. Her previous head coaching experience includes stops at California, whom she led to the Final Four in 2013, and UC Santa Barbara.

== Previous season ==
The 2020-21 USC Trojans women's basketball team finished with an overall record of 10-11 and a 8-10 conference record. They earned the 8th seed in the 2021 Pac-12 Conference women's basketball tournament. They topped Arizona State in the first round before falling in the quarterfinals to top-seeded Stanford, who won the tournament as well as the NCAA Championship.

After the season, head coach Mark Trakh announced his retirement. Members of his coaching staff found jobs elsewhere like Aarika Hughes who took the head coaching job at Loyola Marymount. Athletic Director Mike Bohn hired Gottlieb shortly after Trakh's retirement and commented that the Athletics Department would truly invest in the storied women's basketball program.

== Offseason changes ==
=== Departures ===
Name	Number	Pos.	Height	Year	Hometown	Reason for Departure
Shalexxus Aaron	1	G	6'1"	RS Sophomore	Apple Valley, CA	Transferred to Syracuse
Endyia Rogers	5	G	5'7"	Sophomore	Dallas, TX	Transferred to Oregon

=== Incoming transfer ===
Name	Num	Pos.	Height	Year	Hometown	Previous School
Tera Reed	24	G	6'0"	Graduate Student	Auckland, NZ	VCU

=== 2021 recruiting class ===
This season, the Women of Troy bring in the seventh-ranked recruiting class.

Name	Overall Rank	Position	Position Rank	Hometown	High School	Height	ESPN Stars	ESPN Grade
Clarice Akunwafo	21	F	2	Inglewood, CA	Rolling Hills Prep	6'5"	4	95
Rayah Marshall	27	G	10	Los Angeles, CA	Lynwood HS	6'3"	4	94
Isabella Perkins		G	34	Chantilly, VA	Paul VI HS	5'8"	3	89

== Roster ==
2021–22 USC Trojans women's basketball team
Players
Coaches

Pos.	#	Name	Height	Year	Previous school	Hometown
G	1	Rayah Marshall	6 ft 4 in (1.93 m)	Fr	Lynwood HS	Los Angeles, CA
F	5	Jordan Sanders	5 ft 11 in (1.8 m)	GS	UC Irvine	Springfield, MO
G	10	Amaya Oliver	6 ft 2 in (1.88 m)	So	St. Mary's HS	Stockton, CA
G	11	Shemera Williams	5 ft 8 in (1.73 m)	Jr	Virginia	Milwaukee, WI
G	12	Isabella Perkins	5 ft 9 in (1.75 m)	Fr	Paul VI HS	Chantilly, VA
C	15	Angel Jackson	6 ft 5 in (1.96 m)	Jr	Salesian HS	Richmond, CA
G	22	Kyra White	5 ft 10 in (1.78 m)	Jr	Converse Judson HS	Converse, TX
G	23	Madison Campbell	5 ft 11 in (1.8 m)	RS So	Clovis West HS	Fresno, CA
G	24	Tera Reed	6 ft 0 in (1.83 m)	GS	VCU	Auckland, NZ
G	24	Desiree Caldwell (C)	5 ft 8 in (1.73 m)	Sr	Byron P. Steel II HS	San Antonio, TX
G	25	Alyson Miura	5 ft 9 in (1.75 m)	Jr	La Salle Prep	Clackamas, OR
G	30	India Otto (W)	5 ft 9 in (1.75 m)	Jr	Windward HS	Los Angeles, CA
C	32	Clarice Akunwafo	6 ft 6 in (1.98 m)	Fr	Rolling Hills Prep	Inglewood, CA
F	32	Jordyn Jenkins	6 ft 2 in (1.88 m)	So	Kentridge HS	Kent, WA
F	35	Alissa Pili (C)	6 ft 0 in (1.83 m)	Jr	Dimond HS	Anchorage, AK

Head coach

- Lindsay Gottlieb (Brown)

Assistant coach(es)

- Danyelle Grant (Utah State)
- Wendale Farrow (Eastern Michigan)
- Nneka Enemkpali (Texas)

Legend

- (C) Team captain
- (S) Suspended
- (I) Ineligible
- (W) Walk-on
- Injured
- Current redshirt

Roster
Last update: February 15, 2022

== Schedule ==
Date time, TV	Rank^{#}	Opponent^{#}	Result	Record	High points	High rebounds	High assists	Site city, state
Non-conference regular season
November 6, 2021*; 2:00 pm, N/A		Antelope Valley; Exhibition	W 120–34	–	18 – Pili	8 – Marshall	6 – White	Galen Center (304); Los Angeles, CA
November 11, 2021*; 7:00 pm, live stream		Hawaii; High School Night	W 90–50	1–0	17 – Sanders	9 – Marshall	5 – Tied	Galen Center (1,147); Los Angeles, CA
November 14, 2021*; 10:00 am, ACCN		at Virginia	W 65–48	2–0	16 – Marshall	10 – Tied	4 – Caldwell	John Paul Jones Arena (1,385); Charlottesville, VA
November 18, 2021*; 7:00 pm, live stream		Western Michigan	W 80–50	3–0	17 – Jenkins	9 – Jackson	5 – Caldwell	Galen Center (415); Los Angeles, CA
November 20, 2021*; 2:00 pm, live stream		Missouri State; Rep Your Team Day	L 41–67	3–1	11 – Sanders	9 – Tied	2 – Marshall	Galen Center (372); Los Angeles, CA
November 25, 2021*; 1:00 pm, FloHoops		vs. Seton Hall; Cancún Challenge	W 79–65	4–1	18 – Jenkins	12 – Jenkins	4 – Tied	Hard Rock Hotel Riviera Maya (131); Cancún, Mexico
								Hard Rock Hotel Riviera Maya; Cancún, Mexico
November 27, 2021*; 1:00 pm, FloHoops		vs. UCF; Cancún Challenge	L 47–56	4–2	12 – Miura	7 – Marshall	3 – Caldwell	Hard Rock Hotel Riviera Maya (114); Cancún, Mexico
12/2/2021*; 7:00 pm, USC Live Stream		UC Irvine	W 78–69	5–2	24 – Jenkins	7 – Jenkins	5 – Miura	Galen Center (507); Los Angeles, CA
12/5/2021*; 2:00 pm, USC Live Stream		San Francisco	L 63–78	5–3	15 – Tie	9 – Reed	5 – Reed	Galen Center (312); Los Angeles, CA
December 15, 2021*; 12:00 pm, live stream		CSU Northridge	W 76–51	6–3	15 – Sanders	8 – Marshall	4 – Reed	Galen Center (527); Los Angeles, CA
December 18, 2021*; 2:00 pm, live stream		Texas Southern	W 77–45	7–3	16 – Marshall	14 – Sanders	5 – Marshall	Galen Center (1,026); Los Angeles, CA
December 21, 2021*; 7:00 pm		at Long Beach State	Canceled due to COVID-19 protocols within the Long Beach State program. (Note: This game was canceled on December 20 due to COVID-19 protocols within the Beach program.)					Walter Pyramid; Long Beach, CA
Pac-12 regular season
January 2, 2022; 6:00 pm, P12N		Arizona State	Postponed due to COVID-19 protocols within the USC program. (Note: This game was postponed on December 29 due to COVID-19 protocols within the Trojans program.)					Galen Center; Los Angeles, CA
January 7, 2022; 6:00 pm, P12N		at Colorado	L 58–71	7–4 (0–1)	14 – Jenkins	10 – Marshall	2 – Tied	CU Events Center (1,592); Boulder, CO
January 9, 2022 (Note: This game was originally scheduled on December 31 before being postponed and rescheduled to January 9 due to COVID-19 protocols within the USC program.); 3:00 pm, live stream		No. 4 Arizona	W 76–67	8–4 (1–1)	15 – Miura	7 – Jenkins	6 – Miura	Galen Center (0); Los Angeles, CA
January 14, 2022; 7:00 pm, P12N		Washington State	L 63–71	8–5 (1–2)	20 – Jenkins	7 – Caldwell	9 – Reed	Galen Center (0); Los Angeles, CA
01/16/2022; 12:00 pm, P12N		Washington	W 73–66	9–5 (2–2)	24 – Jenkins	7 – Marshall	7 – Reed	Galen Center (0); Los Angeles, CA
January 20, 2022 (Note: This game was originally scheduled on December 28 before being postponed and rescheduled to January 20 due to COVID-19 protocols within both programs.); 6:30 pm, P12N		at UCLA; Rivalry	L 43–66	9–6 (2–3)	17 – Jenkins	11 – Jenkins	2 – Caldwell	Pauley Pavilion (0); Los Angeles, CA
January 23, 2022 (Note: This game was originally scheduled on January 22 before being postponed and rescheduled to January 23 due to the earlier meeting being pushed back to the same week.); 6:00 pm, P12N		UCLA; Rivalry	L 58–68	9–7 (2–4)	13 – Tied	5 – Jenkins	5 – Caldwell	Galen Center (1,892); Los Angeles, CA
January 28, 2022; 7:00 pm, P12N		at Oregon State	L 61–63 ^{OT}	9–8 (2–5)	17 – Marshall	14 – Jenkins	5 – Caldwell	Gill Coliseum (4,336); Corvallis, OR
January 30, 2022; 12:00 pm, P12N		at No. 19 Oregon	L 48–80	9–9 (2–6)	16 – Jenkins	9 – Marshall	5 – Caldwell	Matthew Knight Arena (7,613); Eugene, OR
February 4, 2022; 7:00 pm, P12N		California	L 59–62	9–10 (2–7)	26 – Jenkins	12 – Marshall	6 – Caldwell	Galen Center (2,098); Los Angeles, CA
February 6, 2022; 3:00 pm, P12N		No. 2 Stanford; Pink Game	L 57–83	9–11 (2–8)	20 – Jenkins	7 – Jenkins	3 – Caldwell	Galen Center (1,274); Los Angeles, CA
February 9, 2022 (Note: This game was originally scheduled on January 9 before being postponed and rescheduled to February 9 due to COVID-19 protocols within the Utah program.); 1:00 pm, Live Stream		at Utah	L 69–91	9–12 (2–9)	21 – Jenkins	6 – Marshall	5 – Caldwell	Jon M. Huntsman Center (1,810); Salt Lake City, UT
February 11, 2022; 7:00 pm, P12N		at Washington	W 70–57	10–12 (3–9)	29 – Jenkins	15 – Jenkins	2 – Pili	Alaska Airlines Arena (1,505); Seattle, WA
February 13, 2022; 12:00 pm, P12N		at Washington State	L 54–57	10–13 (3–10)	18 – Jenkins	12 – Jenkins	2 – Tied	Beasley Coliseum (690); Pullman, WA
February 18, 2022; 7:00 pm, P12N		Utah	W 83–62	11–13 (4–10)	24 – Sanders	10 – Marshall	4 – Tied	Galen Center (689); Los Angeles, CA
February 20, 2022; 1:00 pm, P12N		Colorado	L 54–67	11–14 (4–11)	13 – Marshall	11 – Marshall	3 – Tied	Galen Center (836); Los Angeles, CA
February 24, 2022; 4:00 pm, P12N		at Arizona State	W 60–58	12–14 (5–11)	17 – Tied	11 – Marshall	5 – Caldwell	Desert Financial Arena (2,809); Tempe, AZ
February 26, 2022; 11:00 am, P12N		at No. 12 Arizona	L 59–68	12–15 (5–12)	19 – Miura	7 – Reed	4 – Tied	McKale Center (8,256); Tucson, AZ
Pac-12 Women's Tournament
March 2, 2022; 6:00 pm, P12N	(10)	vs. (7) UCLA; First Round	L 60–73	12–16	18 – Sanders	10 – Marshall	4 – Caldwell	Michelob Ultra Arena (3,010); Paradise, NV
*Non-conference game. ^{#}Rankings from AP Poll. (#) Tournament seedings in parentheses. All times are in Pacific Time.

== Rankings ==
Ranking movements Legend: ██ Increase in ranking ██ Decrease in ranking — = Not ranked RV = Received votes
	Week																				
Poll	Pre	1	2	3	4	5	6	7	8	9	10	11	12	13	14	15	16	17	18	19	Final
AP	—	—*	RV	—	—	—	—	—	—	—	—	—	—	—	—	—					Not released
Coaches	—	—*	—^	—	—	—	—	—	—	—	—	—	—	—	—						

*The preseason and week 1 polls were the same.
^Coaches did not release a week 2 poll.

=== Awards and honors ===
- Akunwafo
  - McDonald's High School All-American
  - Jersey Mike's Naismith Trophy for High School Girls Player of the Year, 2021 Watch List
  - Jordan Brand Classic
- Jackson
  - McDonald's High School All-American
  - Jordan Brand Classic
- Marshall
  - McDonald's High School All-American
  - Jersey Mike's Naismith Trophy for High School Girls Player of the Year, 2021 Watch List
  - Jordan Brand Classic
- Oliver
  - All Pac-12 Freshman Team Honorable Mention
- Perkins
  - Virginia Gatorade Girls Basketball Player of the Year
- Pili
  - All Pac-12 First Team
  - Pac-12 Freshman of the Year
  - 3-time Alaska Gatorade Girls Basketball Player of the Year
  - 2-time MaxPreps National Female Athlete of the Year
  - Katrina McClain Preseason Watchlist (2020, 2021)
  - Naismith Watch List (2020, 2021)
  - John R. Wooden Watch List
- Reed
  - 2-time All-Atlantic 10 First Team (VCU)
- Sanders
  - All Pac-12 Honorable Mention
  - All-Big West First Team (UCI)
  - Big West Freshman of the Year (UCI)
- Williams
  - 2-time USA Today Wisconsin Player of the Year
  - Associated Press Wisconsin Player of the Year
