= 2021–22 Arizona State Sun Devils women's basketball team =

Sports team season

2021–22 Arizona State Sun Devils women's basketball
- Conference: Pac-12 Conference
- Record: 12–14 (4–9 Pac-12)
- Head coach: Charli Turner Thorne (25th season)
- Assistant coaches: Jackie Moore; Nikki Blue; Yvonne Sanchez
- Home arena: Desert Financial Arena

2021–22 Pac-12 Conference women's basketball standings
	Conf.				Overall
Team	W		L	PCT	W		L	PCT
No. 2 Stanford †	16	–	0	1.000	32	–	4	.889
Oregon	11	–	6	.647	20	–	12	.625
Washington State	11	–	6	.647	19	–	11	.633
No. 19 Arizona	10	–	6	.625	21	–	8	.724
Colorado	9	–	7	.563	22	–	9	.710
Utah	8	–	7	.533	21	–	12	.636
UCLA	8	–	8	.500	18	–	13	.581
Oregon State	6	–	9	.400	17	–	14	.548
Arizona State	4	–	9	.308	12	–	14	.462
USC	5	–	12	.294	12	–	16	.429
California	2	–	10	.167	11	–	13	.458
Washington	2	–	12	.143	7	–	16	.304
† 2022 Pac-12 Tournament winner Rankings from AP poll

The 2021–22 Arizona State women's basketball team represented Arizona State University during the 2021–22 NCAA Division I women's basketball season. The Sun Devils were led by twenty fifth-year head coach Charli Turner Thorne (who retired at the end of the season). and they played their home games at the Desert Financial Arena and competed as members of the Pac-12 Conference.

== Previous season ==
The Sun Devils finished the season 20–11, 10–8 in Pac-12 play to finish in sixth place. They advanced to the first round of the Pac-12 women's tournament where they lost to California. The NCAA tournament and WNIT were cancelled due to the COVID-19 pandemic.

== Offseason ==
=== Departures ===
Due to COVID-19 disruptions throughout NCAA sports in 2020–21, the NCAA announced that the 2020–21 season would not count against the athletic eligibility of any individual involved in an NCAA winter sport, including women's basketball. This meant that all seniors in 2020–21 had the option to return for 2021–22.

Arizona State Departures
Name	Pos.	Height	Year	Hometown	Reason for Departure

=== Incoming ===
Arizona State incoming transfers
Name	Pos.	Height	Year	Hometown	Previous School	Source

== Roster ==
2021–22 Arizona State Sun Devils women's basketball team
Players
Coaches

Pos.	#	Name	Height	Year	Previous school	Hometown
G	0	Taya Hanson	5 ft 10 in (1.78 m)	Sr	Kelowna HS	Kelowna, BC
G	2	Jaddan Simmons	5 ft 9 in (1.75 m)	So	Green Bay Southwest HS	Green Bay, WI
G	3	Gabriela Bosquez	5 ft 7 in (1.7 m)	Jr	Blinn College	Kyle, TX
G	5	Ayzhiana Basallo	5 ft 5 in (1.65 m)	Sr	St. Ignatius	San Francisco, CA
G	11	Sydney Erikstrup	6 ft 1 in (1.85 m)	So	Beaverton HS	Portland, OR
G	12	Mael Gillies	6 ft 1 in (1.85 m)	GS	Montmorency	Montreal, Quebec
G/F	13	Maggie Besselink	6 ft 3 in (1.91 m)	So	Holy Cross HS	Kingston, Ontario
F	20	Katelyn Levings	6 ft 3 in (1.91 m)	So	Edmond Memorial HS	Oklahoma City, OK
G/F	30	Jade Loville	5 ft 11 in (1.8 m)	Sr	Skyline (Wash.)	Scottsdale, Arizona
F	32	Jayde Van Hyfte	6 ft 1 in (1.85 m)	Sr	Annawan HS	Annawan, IL
F	42	Meg Newman (injured)	6 ft 3 in (1.91 m)	Fr	North Central HS	Indianapolis, IN
C	43	Imogen Greenslade	6 ft 4 in (1.93 m)	So	MLC School	Sydney, Australia
F	44	Isadora Sousa	6 ft 0 in (1.83 m)	Jr	Colegio A-Escopo	Sao Paulo, Brazil

Head coach

- Charli Turner Thorne (Stanford)

Assistant coach(es)

- Jackie Moore (Armstrong State)
- Nikki Blue (UCLA)
- Yvonne Sanchez (US International)

Legend

- (C) Team captain
- (S) Suspended
- (I) Ineligible
- (W) Walk-on
- Injured
- Current redshirt

Roster

== Schedule ==
Date time, TV	Rank^{#}	Opponent^{#}	Result	Record	High points	High rebounds	High assists	Site (attendance) city, state
Regular season
November 25, 2020*; 4:00 pm, ASU Live Stream – 2		Stephen F. Austin	W 56–47	1–0	14 – Hanson	12 – Walker	– Walker	Desert Financial Arena; Tempe, AZ
November 27, 2020*; 4:00 pm, ASU Live Steam – 2		VCU	W 49–40	2–0	13 – Walker	13 – Walker	4 – Mbulito	Desert Financial Arena; Tempe, AZ
November 30, 2020*; 4:00 pm, ASU Live Steam – 2		Saint Mary's	W 62–53	3–0	9 – Tied	4 – Tied	4 – Mbulito	Desert Financial Arena; Tempe, AZ
December 4, 2020; 5:00 pm, P12N		USC	W 63–58	4–0 (1–0)	20 – Simmons	8 – Sanders	4 – Mbulito	Desert Financial Arena; Tempe, AZ
December 10, 2020; 4:00 pm, P12N		at No. 6 Arizona	L 37–65	4–2 (1–2)	14 – Hanson	9 – Walker	2 – Tied	McKale Center; Tucson, AZ
December 13, 2020*; 2:00 pm, ASU Live Stream – 2		San Diego	W 64–55	5–2	16 – Simmons	9 – Walker	5 – Simmons	Desert Financial Arena; Tempe, AZ
December 18, 2020; 3:00 pm, P12N		at Utah	W 56–48	6–2 (2–2)	15 – Hanson	8 – Besselink	2 – Hanson	Jon M. Huntsman Center; Salt Lake City, UT
December 20, 2021; 2:00 pm, P12N		at Colorado	Postponed					CU Events Center; Boulder, CO
January 1, 2021; 6:30 pm, P12N		California	W 56–53	7–2 (3–2)	21 – Hanson	8 – Levings	7 – Simmons	Desert Financial Arena; Tempe, AZ
January 3, 2021; 4:00 pm, P12N		No. 1 Stanford	L 60–68	7–3 (3–3)	16 – Simmons	7 – Besselink	2 – Hanson	Desert Financial Arena; Tempe, AZ
January 15, 2021; 5:30 pm, P12N		Oregon State	Postponed					Desert Financial Arena; Tempe, AZ
January 17, 2021; 12:00 pm, P12N		No. 10 Oregon	Postponed					Desert Financial Arena; Tempe, AZ
January 22, 2021; 3:00 pm, P12N		Colorado	W 51–47	8–3 (4–3)	16 – Hanson	6 – Tied	4 – Loera	Desert Financial Arena; Tempe, AZ
January 24, 2021; 2:00 pm, ASU Live Stream		Utah	L 51–65	8–4 (4–4)	13 – Simmons	6 – Tied	4 – Sanders	Desert Financial Arena; Tempe, AZ
January 29, 2021; 7:00 pm, P12N		at No. 5 UCLA	L 57–60	8–5 (4–5)	12 – Hanson	9 – Greenslade	3 – Simmons	Desert Financial Arena; Tempe, AZ
February 5, 2021; 9:00 pm, P12N		at No. 12 Oregon	Postponed					Matthew Knight Arena; Eugene, OR
February 7, 2021; 1:00 pm, P12N		at Oregon State	Postponed					Gill Coliseum; Corvallis, OR
February 8, 2021; 4:00 pm, ASU Live Stream		Southern Utah	W 55–44	9–6	15 – Hanson	7 – Walker	4 – Simmons	Desert Financial Arena; Tempe, AZ
February 12, 2021; 5:00 pm, P12N		Washington	L 35–50	9–7 (4–7)	11 – Hanson	7 – Hanson	3 – Tied	Desert Financial Arena; Tempe, AZ
February 14, 2021; 12:30 pm, P12N		Washington State	W 67–61	10–7 (5–7)	15 – Simmons	6 – Levings	4 – Simmons	Desert Financial Arena; Tempe, AZ
February 19, 2021; 7:00 pm, P12N		at No. 5 Stanford	L 41–80	10–8 (5–8)	11 – Walker	4 – Tied	3 – Tied	Maples Pavilion; Stanford, CA
February 21, 2021; 2:00 pm, P12N		California	L 55–67	10–9 (5–9)	17 – Hanson	7 – Walker	4 – Simmons	Haas Pavilion; Berkeley, CA
February 28, 2021; 12:00 pm, P12N		No. 9 Arizona	W 66–64 ^{OT}	11–9 (6–9)	19 – Hansen	13 – Besselink	4 – Mbulito	Desert Financial Arena; Tempe, AZ
February 18, 2022; 8:00 pm, P12N		at Washington State	L 58–65	12–10 (4–6)	22 – Simmons	7 – Gilles	3 – Tied	Beasley Coliseum (874); Pullman, WA
February 20, 2022; 1:00 pm, P12N		at Washington	L 69–74	12–11 (4–7)	14 – Levings	8 – Gilles	7 – Gilles	Hec Edmundson Pavilion (1,442); Seattle, WA
February 24, 2022; 5:00 pm, P12N		USC	L 58–60	12–12 (4–8)	22 – Loville	12 – Levings	6 – Gilles	Desert Financial Arena (2,809); Tempe, AZ
February 26, 2022; 12:00 pm, P12N		UCLA	L 52–59	12–13 (4–9)	21 – Loville	6 – Simmons	5 – Gilles	Desert Financial Arena (2,176); Tempe, AZ
Pac-12 Tournament
March 2, 2022; 3:30 pm, P12N	(9)	vs. (8) Oregon State; First Round	L 54–59	12–14	18 – Hanson	9 – Tied	3 – Tied	Michelob Ultra Arena (3,044); Paradise, NV
*Non-conference game. ^{#}Rankings from AP Poll. (#) Tournament seedings in parentheses. All times are in Mountain Time.

== Rankings ==
Ranking movements Legend: ██ Increase in ranking ██ Decrease in ranking — = Not ranked RV = Received votes
	Week																				
Poll	Pre	1	2	3	4	5	6	7	8	9	10	11	12	13	14	15	16	17	18	19	Final
AP	—	—*	—	—	—	—	—	—	—	—	—	—	—	—	—	RV	—	—	—	—	Not released
Coaches	—	—*	—^	—	—	—	—	—	—	—	—	—	—	—	—	RV	—	—	—	—	—

*The preseason and Week 1 polls were the same.
^Coaches did not release a Week 2 poll.

== See also ==
2021–22 Arizona State Sun Devils men's basketball team
