= 2021–22 Stanford Cardinal women's basketball team =

American college basketball season

2021–22 Stanford Cardinal women's basketball

Pac-12 Tournament champions Pac-12 regular season champions

NCAA tournament, Final Four
- Conference: Pac-12 Conference

Ranking
- Coaches: No. 3
- AP: No. 2
- Record: 32–4 (16–0 Pac-12)
- Head coach: Tara VanDerveer (36th season)
- Associate head coach: Kate Paye (15th season)
- Assistant coaches: Katy Steding (2nd season); Britney Anderson (2nd season)
- Home arena: Maples Pavilion

2021–22 Pac-12 Conference women's basketball standings
	Conf.				Overall
Team	W		L	PCT	W		L	PCT
No. 2 Stanford †	16	–	0	1.000	32	–	4	.889
Oregon	11	–	6	.647	20	–	12	.625
Washington State	11	–	6	.647	19	–	11	.633
No. 19 Arizona	10	–	6	.625	21	–	8	.724
Colorado	9	–	7	.563	22	–	9	.710
Utah	8	–	7	.533	21	–	12	.636
UCLA	8	–	8	.500	18	–	13	.581
Oregon State	6	–	9	.400	17	–	14	.548
Arizona State	4	–	9	.308	12	–	14	.462
USC	5	–	12	.294	12	–	16	.429
California	2	–	10	.167	11	–	13	.458
Washington	2	–	12	.143	7	–	16	.304
† 2022 Pac-12 Tournament winner Rankings from AP poll

The 2021–22 Stanford Cardinal women's basketball team represented Stanford University during the 2021–22 NCAA Division I women's basketball season. The Cardinal were led by thirty-sixth year head coach Tara VanDerveer, and they played their home games at Maples Pavilion as members of the Pac-12 Conference. They entered this season as the defending NCAA champions.

== Roster ==
2021–22 Stanford Cardinal women's basketball team
Players
Coaches

Pos.	#	Name	Height	Year	Previous school	Hometown
G	2	Agnes Emma-Nnopu	5 ft 11 in (1.8 m)	So	Lake Ginninderra College	Ocean Grove, Victoria
G	3	Anna Wilson	5 ft 9 in (1.75 m)	RS Sr	Bellevue	Bellevue, WA
G	4	Jana Van Gytenbeek	5 ft 7 in (1.7 m)	So	Cherry Creek	Greenwood Village, CO
F	5	Francesca Belibi	6 ft 1 in (1.85 m)	Jr	Regis Jesuit	Centennial, CO
F	10	Alyssa Jerome	6 ft 3 in (1.91 m)	RS Sr	Harbord Collegiate	Toronto, ON
F	11	Ashten Prechtel	6 ft 5 in (1.96 m)	Jr	Discovery Canyon	Colorado Springs, CO
F	12	Lexie Hull	6 ft 1 in (1.85 m)	Sr	Central Valley	Spokane, WA
G	14	Jordan Hamilton	5 ft 8 in (1.73 m)	RS Sr	Liberty	Frisco, TX
G	20	Elena Bosgana	6 ft 2 in (1.88 m)	Fr	American Community	Athens, GR
F	21	Brooke Demetre	6 ft 3 in (1.91 m)	Fr	Mater Dei	Foothill Ranch, CA
F	22	Cameron Brink	6 ft 4 in (1.93 m)	So	Mountainside	Beaverton, OR
F	24	Lacie Hull	6 ft 1 in (1.85 m)	Sr	Central Valley	Spokane, WA
G	30	Haley Jones	6 ft 1 in (1.85 m)	Jr	Archbishop Mitty	Santa Cruz, CA
G	32	Jzaniya Harriel	5 ft 10 in (1.78 m)	Fr	Antelope	Sacramento, CA
G	33	Hannah Jump	6 ft 0 in (1.83 m)	Jr	Pinewood	San Jose, CA
F	44	Kiki Iriafen	6 ft 3 in (1.91 m)	Fr	Harvard-Westlake	Los Angeles, CA
G	54	Jenna Brown	5 ft 10 in (1.78 m)	RS Jr	The Lovett School	Atlanta, GA

Head coach

- Tara VanDerveer (Indiana)

Assistant coach(es)

- Kate Paye (Stanford)
- Katy Steding (Stanford)
- Britney Anderson (Virginia Tech)

Legend

- (C) Team captain
- (S) Suspended
- (I) Ineligible
- (W) Walk-on
- Injured
- Current redshirt

Roster
Last update: January 27, 2022

== Schedule ==
Date time, TV	Rank^{#}	Opponent^{#}	Result	Record	High points	High rebounds	High assists	Site (attendance) city, state
Exhibition
November 6, 2021; 12:00 pm, N/A	No. 3	Clarke	W 105–35	–	14 – Jones	11 – Iriafen	3 – Tied	Maples Pavilion (2,338); Stanford, CA
Regular season
November 11, 2021; 3:00 pm, live stream	No. 3	Morgan State	W 91–36	1–0	12 – Belibi	5 – Tied	4 – Le. Hull	Maples Pavilion (2,696); Stanford, CA
November 14, 2021; 12:00 pm, ESPN	No. 3	No. 25 Texas	L 56–61	1–1	16 – Le. Hull	11 – Le. Hull	5 – Jones	Maples Pavilion (3,681); Stanford, CA
November 16, 2021; 7:00 pm, P12N	No. 7	Portland	W 77–55	2–1	21 – Brink	12 – Jones	10 – Jones	Maples Pavilion (2,352); Stanford, CA
November 21, 2021; 1:00 pm, SWX	No. 7	at Gonzaga	W 66–62	3–1	14 – Tied	7 – Le. Hull	7 – La. Hull	McCarthey Athletic Center (6,000); Spokane, WA
November 25, 2021; 10:30 am, FloHoops	No. 7	vs. No. 4 Indiana; Baha Mar Hoops	W 69–66	4–1	21 – Brink	22 – Brink	5 – Brink	Baha Mar Convention Center (1,307); Nassau, Bahamas
November 26, 2021; 9:00 am, FloHoops	No. 7	vs. No. 18 South Florida; Baha Mar Hoops	L 54–57	4–2	23 – Brink	11 – Brink	5 – La. Hull	Baha Mar Convention Center (205); Nassau, Bahamas
November 27, 2021; 12:00 pm, FloHoops	No. 7	vs. No. 2 Maryland; Baha Mar Hoops	W 86–68	5–2	21 – Jump	13 – Jones	4 – Jones	Baha Mar Convention Center (1,237); Nassau, Bahamas
December 12, 2021; 12:00 pm, live stream	No. 4	Pacific	W 91–62	6–2	25 – Brink	11 – Brink	5 – Wilson	Maples Pavilion (2,789); Stanford, CA
December 15, 2021; 7:00 pm, live stream	No. 3	UC Davis	W 68–42	7–2	17 – Jump	10 – Brink	5 – Le. Hull	Maples Pavilion (2,620); Stanford, CA
December 18, 2021; 2:15 pm, ESPN2	No. 3	at No. 7 Tennessee; Rivalry	W 74–63	8–2	18 – Jones	19 – Jones	6 – Jones	Thompson-Boling Arena (10,017); Knoxville, TN
December 21, 2021; 4:00 pm, ESPN2	No. 2	at No. 1 South Carolina	L 61–65	8–3	17 – Le. Hull	9 – Prechtel	4 – Prechtel	Colonial Life Arena (13,070); Columbia, SC
December 31, 2021; 7:00 pm, P12N	No. 2	at Washington	Postponed due to COVID-19 protocols within the Washington program. (Note: This game was postponed on December 27 due to COVID-19 protocols within the Huskies program.)					Alaska Airlines Arena; Seattle, WA
January 2, 2022; 12:00 pm, P12N	No. 2	at Washington State	W 82–44	9–3 (1–0)	24 – Jones	16 – Jones	3 – Jones	Beasley Coliseum (873); Pullman, WA
January 7, 2022; 7:00 pm, P12N	No. 2	Oregon	W 80–68	10–3 (2–0)	33 – Le. Hull	7 – Jones	4 – Tied	Maples Pavilion (0); Stanford, CA
January 9, 2022; 3:00 pm, live stream	No. 2	Gonzaga	W 66–50	11–3	21 – Jump	16 – Brink	4 – Le. Hull	Maples Pavilion (32); Stanford, CA
January 14, 2022; 6:00 pm, P12N	No. 2	at No. 22 Colorado	W 60–52	12–3 (3–0)	11 – Jones	8 – Tied	5 – Jones	CU Events Center (3,744); Boulder, CO
January 16, 2022; 11:00 am, P12N	No. 2	at Utah	W 83–73	13–3 (4–0)	24 – Brink	11 – Brink	4 – Tied	Jon M. Huntsman Center (1,911); Salt Lake City, UT
January 21, 2022; 7:00 pm, P12N	No. 2	California	W 97–74	14–3 (5–0)	26 – Jones	10 – Jones	7 – Hamilton	Maples Pavilion (0); Stanford, CA
January 23, 2022; 4:00 pm, P12N	No. 2	at California	Postponed due to COVID-19 protocols within the California program.					Haas Pavilion; Berkeley, CA
January 28, 2022; 6:00 pm, P12N	No. 2	Arizona State	W 78–50	15–3 (6–0)	12 – Tied	10 – Jones	3 – Jones	Maples Pavilion (2,551); Stanford, CA
January 30, 2022; 1:00 pm, ESPN2	No. 2	No. 8 Arizona	W 75–69	16–3 (7–0)	25 – Brink	15 – Brink	6 – Jones	Maples Pavilion (3,479); Stanford, CA
February 3, 2022; 7:00 pm, ESPN	No. 2	at UCLA	W 76–48	17–3 (8–0)	20 – Belibi	13 – Belibi	7 – La. Hull	Pauley Pavilion (2,100); Los Angeles, CA
February 6, 2022; 3:00 pm, P12N	No. 2	at USC	W 83–57	18–3 (9–0)	26 – Brink	14 – Brink	6 – Wilson	Galen Center (1,274); Los Angeles, CA
February 9, 2022 (Note: This game was originally scheduled on January 9 before being postponed and rescheduled to February 9 due to COVID-19 protocols within the Oregon State program.); 2:00 pm, P12N	No. 2	Oregon State	W 82–59	19–3 (10–0)	19 – Jump	6 – Jones	3 – Tied	Maples Pavilion (2,354); Stanford, CA
February 11, 2022; 7:00 pm, P12N	No. 2	Utah	W 91–64	20–3 (11–0)	15 – Jones	7 – Brink	6 – Wilson	Maples Pavilion (3,044); Stanford, CA
February 13, 2022; 12:00 pm, P12N	No. 2	Colorado	W 63–46	21–3 (12–0)	14 – Le. Hull	11 – Brink	5 – Wilson	Maples Pavilion (3,038); Stanford, CA
February 18, 2022; 7:00 pm, P12N	No. 2	at Oregon State	W 87–63	22–3 (13–0)	21 – Le. Hull	10 – Tied	3 – Tied	Gill Coliseum (5,004); Corvallis, OR
February 20, 2022; 1:00 pm, ESPN2	No. 2	at Oregon	W 66–62	23–3 (14–0)	18 – Jones	9 – Jones	3 – Wilson	Matthew Knight Arena (8,981); Eugene, OR
February 24, 2022; 8:00 pm, P12N	No. 2	Washington State	W 61–54	24–3 (15–0)	16 – Brink	15 – Brink	4 – Jones	Maples Pavilion (3,007); Stanford, CA
February 26, 2022; 12:00 pm, P12N	No. 2	Washington	W 63–56	25–3 (16–0)	17 – Brink	11 – Brink	4 – La. Hull	Maples Pavilion (3,777); Stanford, CA
Pac-12 Women's Tournament
March 3, 2022; 2:30 pm, P12N	(1) No. 2	vs. (8) Oregon State; Quarterfinals	W 57–44	26–3	20 – Jones	14 – Jones	6 – Jones	Michelob Ultra Arena (4,122); Paradise, NV
March 4, 2022; 6:00 pm, P12N	(1) No. 2	vs. (5) Colorado; Semifinals	W 71–45	27–3	17 – Jones	9 – Brink	5 – La. Hull	Michelob Ultra Arena (4,917); Paradise, NV
March 6, 2022; 3:00 pm, ESPN2	(1) No. 2	vs. (6) Utah; Championship	W 73–48	28–3	19 – Jones	7 – Belibi	4 – Tied	Michelob Ultra Arena (4,709); Paradise, NV
NCAA tournament
March 18, 2022*; 7:00 pm, ESPN2	(1 S) No. 2	(16 S) Montana State; First Round	W 78–37	29–3	15 – Jump	13 – Belibi	5 – Le. Hull	Maples Pavilion (3,648); Stanford, CA
March 20, 2022*; 6:00 pm, ESPN	(1 S) No. 2	(8 S) Kansas; Second Round	W 91–65	30–3	36 – Le. Hull	12 – Brink	4 – Tied	Maples Pavilion (4,189); Stanford, CA
March 25, 2022*; 6:30 pm, ESPN	(1 S) No. 2	vs. (4 S) No. 13 Maryland; Sweet Sixteen	W 72–66	31–3	19 – Le. Hull	10 – Jones	6 – Jones	Spokane Arena (7,142); Spokane, WA
March 27, 2022*; 6:00 pm, ESPN	(1 S) No. 2	vs. (2 S) No. 6 Texas; Elite Eight	W 59–50	32–3	20 – Le. Hull	12 – Jones	4 – Tied	Spokane Arena (7,739); Spokane, WA
April 1, 2022*; 6:30 pm, ESPN	(1 S) No. 2	vs. (2 B) No. 5 UConn; Final Four	L 58–63	32–4	20 – Jones	11 – Jones	3 – Jones	Target Center (18,268); Minneapolis, MN
*Non-conference game. ^{#}Rankings from AP Poll. (#) Tournament seedings in parentheses. S=Spokane B=Bridgeport. All times are in Pacific Time.

== Rankings ==
Ranking movements Legend: ██ Increase in ranking ██ Decrease in ranking т = Tied with team above or below ( ) = First-place votes
	Week																				
Poll	Pre	1	2	3	4	5	6	7	8	9	10	11	12	13	14	15	16	17	18	19	Final
AP	3 (5)	3 (5)*	7	7	4	4	3	2	2	2	2	2	2	2	2	2	2	2	2 (11)	2 (9)	Not released
Coaches	2т (13)	2т (13)*	2т (13)^	5 (1)	4	4	3	2	3	3 (1)	3 (1)	3	2 (1)	2 (1)	2 (1)	2 (1)	2 (1)	2 (1)	2 (12)	2 (4)	3

*The preseason and week 1 polls were the same.
^Coaches poll was not released for Week 2.
