= 2021–22 Oregon State Beavers women's basketball team =

Intercollegiate basketball season

2021–22 Oregon State Beavers women's basketball

WNIT, Quarterfinals
- Conference: Pac-12 Conference
- Record: 17–14 (6–9 Pac-12)
- Head coach: Scott Rueck (12th season)
- Associate head coach: Jonas Chatterton
- Assistant coaches: Jenny Huth; Deven Hunter
- Home arena: Gill Coliseum

2021–22 Pac-12 Conference women's basketball standings
	Conf.				Overall
Team	W		L	PCT	W		L	PCT
No. 2 Stanford †	16	–	0	1.000	32	–	4	.889
Oregon	11	–	6	.647	20	–	12	.625
Washington State	11	–	6	.647	19	–	11	.633
No. 19 Arizona	10	–	6	.625	21	–	8	.724
Colorado	9	–	7	.563	22	–	9	.710
Utah	8	–	7	.533	21	–	12	.636
UCLA	8	–	8	.500	18	–	13	.581
Oregon State	6	–	9	.400	17	–	14	.548
Arizona State	4	–	9	.308	12	–	14	.462
USC	5	–	12	.294	12	–	16	.429
California	2	–	10	.167	11	–	13	.458
Washington	2	–	12	.143	7	–	16	.304
† 2022 Pac-12 Tournament winner Rankings from AP poll

The 2021–22 Oregon State Beavers women's basketball team represented Oregon State University during the 2021–22 NCAA Division I women's basketball season. The Beavers were led by twelfth-year head coach Scott Rueck, and they played their games at Gill Coliseum as members of the Pac-12 Conference.

== Roster ==
2021–22 Oregon State Beavers women's basketball team
Players
Coaches

Pos.	#	Name	Height	Year	Previous school	Hometown
F	2	Andrea Aquino	6 ft 9 in (2.06 m)	RS So	Ribet Academy	Caacupé, Paraguay
G	4	Noelle Mannen	5 ft 6 in (1.68 m)	RS So	Valley Catholic	North Plains, OR
F	5	Taya Corosdale	6 ft 3 in (1.91 m)	RS Jr	Bothell HS	Bothell, WA
G	10	Greta Kampschroeder	6 ft 0 in (1.83 m)	Fr	Naperville North HS	Naperville, IL
G	11	AJ Marotte	6 ft 1 in (1.85 m)	Fr	Vista Ridge HS	Cedar Park, TX
F/C	12	Jelena Mitrović	6 ft 9 in (2.06 m)	RS Fr	–	Novi Sad, Serbia
F	20	Ellie Mack	6 ft 3 in (1.91 m)	RS Sr	Conestoga HS; Bucknell	Paoli, PA
G	22	Talia von Oelhoffen	5 ft 11 in (1.8 m)	Fr	Chiawana HS	Pasco, WA
G	23	Emily Codding	6 ft 0 in (1.83 m)	RS Sr	Santa Rosa HS; Saint Mary's	Woodstock, GA
G	25	Tea Adams	5 ft 9 in (1.75 m)	RS Sr	Juanita HS	Kirkland, WA
F	41	Jovana Subasic	6 ft 4 in (1.93 m)	RS Sr	Washington State	Šabac, Serbia
F	42	Kennedy Brown	6 ft 6 in (1.98 m)	So	Derby High School	Derby, KS
F	44	Taylor Jones	6 ft 4 in (1.93 m)	So	Dallas Christian	Forney, TX

Head coach

- Scott Rueck (Oregon State)

Assistant coach(es)

- Jonas Chatterton (Utah)
- Jenny Huth (Colorado)
- Deven Hunter (Oregon State)

Legend

- (C) Team captain
- (S) Suspended
- (I) Ineligible
- (W) Walk-on
- Injured
- Current redshirt

Roster
Last update: January 31, 2022

== Schedule ==
Date time, TV	Rank^{#}	Opponent^{#}	Result	Record	High points	High rebounds	High assists	Site (attendance) city, state
Non-conference regular season
November 12, 2021*; 7:00 pm, Live Stream	No. 14	Loyola Marymount	W 82–52	1–0	19 – von Oelhoffen	8 – Jones	5 – Adams	Gill Coliseum (4,502); Corvallis, OR
November 17, 2021*; 7:00 pm, Live Stream	No. 15	Cal Baptist	W 80–72	2–0	18 – von Oelhoffen	12 – Corosdale	4 – Mack	Gill Coliseum (3,754); Corvallis, OR
November 20, 2021*; 12:00 pm, Live Stream	No. 15	Cal State Bakersfield	W 82–51	3–0	19 – Marotte	8 – Corosdale	5 – Adams	Gill Coliseum (4,045); Corvallis, OR
November 26, 2021*; 4:30 pm, FloHoops	No. 16	vs. No. 12 Michigan; Daytona Beach Invitational	L 52–61	3–1	12 – Brown	11 – Corosdale	4 – Corosdale	Ocean Center (350); Daytona Beach, FL
November 27, 2021*; 3:45 pm, FloHoops	No. 16	vs. Notre Dame; Daytona Beach Invitational	L 62–64	3–2	25 – von Oelhoffen	14 – Brown	3 – Brown	Ocean Center; Daytona Beach, FL
December 1, 2021*; 11:00 am, Live Stream	No. 16	Pacific	W 76–72	4–2	18 – von Oelhoffen	13 – Brown	6 – Corosdale	Gill Coliseum (4,239); Corvallis, OR
December 10, 2021*; 4:00 pm, ESPN3	No. 23	at Monmouth	W 72–58	5–2	19 – von Oelhoffen	10 – Mitrovic	5 – von Oelhoffen	OceanFirst Bank Center (687); West Long Branch, NJ
December 12, 2021*; 10:00 am, FloHoops	No. 23	at Villanova	L 52–56	5–3	14 – Mitrovic	13 – Mitrovic	3 – Brown	Finneran Pavilion (905); Villanova, PA
December 17, 2021*; 7:00 pm, Live Stream		vs. Idaho; Maui Jim Maui Classic Semifinals	W 79–49	6–3	16 – Kampschroeder	7 – Tied	7 – Adams	Lahaina Civic Center (0); Lahaina, HI
December 19, 2021*; 7:00 pm, Live Stream		vs. Northern Iowa; Maui Jim Maui Classic Championship	W 70–59	7–3	14 – Tied	9 – Jones	6 – von Oelhoffen	Lahaina Civic Center (415); Lahaina, HI
December 28, 2021*; 6:00 pm, P12N		NC Central	Canceled due to COVID-19 protocols within the NC Central program. (Note: This game was canceled on December 26 due to COVID-19 protocols within the Eagles program. This game was declared a no contest by the NCAA.)					Gill Coliseum; Corvallis, OR
Pac-12 regular season
January 2, 2022; 12:00 pm, P12N		Utah	Postponed due to COVID-19 protocols within the Oregon State program. (Note: This game was postponed on December 29 due to COVID-19 protocols within the Beavers program.)					Gill Coliseum; Corvallis, OR
January 7, 2022; 7:00 pm, P12N		at California	Postponed due to COVID-19 protocols within the Oregon State program. (Note: This game was postponed on January 5 due to COVID-19 protocols within the Beavers program.)					Haas Pavilion; Berkeley, CA
January 13, 2022; 7:00 pm, P12N		No. 7 Arizona	L 53–55	7–4 (0–1)	19 – Corosdale	8 – Corosdale	5 – Tied	Gill Coliseum (4,073); Corvallis, OR
January 15, 2022; 12:30 pm, P12N		Arizona State	Postponed due to COVID-19 protocols within the Arizona State program. (Note: This game was postponed on January 12 due to COVID-19 protocols within the Sun Devils program.)					Gill Coliseum; Corvallis, OR
January 17, 2022 (Note: This game was originally scheduled for December 31 before being postponed and rescheduled to January 17 due to COVID-19 protocols within the Colorado program.); 2:00 pm, Live Stream		No. 22 Colorado	W 69–66 ^{OT}	8–4 (1–1)	17 – von Oelhoffen	7 – Mack	6 – Adams	Gill Coliseum (3,854); Corvallis, OR
January 23, 2022; 12:00 pm, P12N		at Washington	W 47–41	9–4 (2–1)	13 – Brown	8 – Tied	6 – Adams	Alaska Airlines Arena (1,350); Seattle, WA
January 26, 2022 (Note: This game was originally scheduled for January 21 before being postponed and rescheduled to January 26 due to COVID-19 protocols within the Washington State program.); 1:00 pm, Live Stream		at Washington State	L 51–58	9–5 (2–2)	10 – von Oelhoffen	9 – Corosdale	2 – Tied	Beasley Coliseum (654); Pullman, WA
January 28, 2022; 7:00 pm, P12N		USC	W 63–61 ^{OT}	10–5 (3–2)	31 – von Oelhoffen	8 – Tied	4 – von Oelhoffen	Gill Coliseum (4,336); Corvallis, OR
January 30, 2022; 2:00 pm, P12N		UCLA	W 72–58	11–5 (4–2)	21 – von Oelhoffen	10 – Mitrovic	6 – von Oelhoffen	Gill Coliseum (4,341); Corvallis, OR
February 4, 2022; 5:00 pm, P12N		at Arizona State	L 57–67	11–6 (4–3)	16 – von Oelhoffen	7 – Tied	5 – Corosdale	Desert Financial Arena (2,640); Tempe, AZ
February 6, 2022; 11:00 am, P12N		at No. 8 Arizona	L 61–73	11–7 (4–4)	17 – von Oelhoffen	10 – Corosdale	4 – Corosdale	McKale Center (7,505); Tucson, AZ
February 9, 2022 (Note: This game was originally scheduled on January 9 before being postponed and rescheduled to February 9 due to COVID-19 protocols within the Oregon State program.); 2:00 pm, P12N		at No. 2 Stanford	L 59–82	11–8 (4–5)	13 – Mack	5 – Tied	3 – Tied	Maples Pavilion (2,354); Stanford, CA
February 11, 2022; 8:00 pm, P12N		No. 24 Oregon; Rivalry	L 66–74	11–9 (4–6)	19 – Mack	12 – Tied	9 – von Oelhoffen	Gill Coliseum (6,097); Corvallis, OR
February 13, 2022; 1:00 pm, P12N		at No. 24 Oregon; Rivalry	W 68–62	12–9 (5–6)	23 – von Oelhoffen	12 – von Oelhoffen	3 – Codding	Matthew Knight Arena (8,404); Eugene, OR
February 18, 2022; 7:00 pm, P12N		No. 2 Stanford	L 63–87	12–10 (5–7)	16 – von Oehloffen	9 – Corosdale	3 – Tied	Gill Coliseum (5,004); Corvallis, OR
February 20, 2022; 12:00 pm, P12N		California	W 68–59	13–10 (6–7)	14 – Mack	9 – Corosdale	4 – Adams	Gill Coliseum (4,401); Corvallis, OR
February 24, 2022; 4:30 pm, P12N		at Utah	L 58–70	13–11 (6–8)	12 – Mack	7 – Corosdale	3 – von Oehloffen	Jon M. Huntsman Center (2,104); Salt Lake City, UT
February 26, 2022; 11:00 am, P12N		at Colorado	L 45–60	13–12 (6–9)	10 – Mack	5 – Corosdale	2 – Tied	CU Events Center; Boulder, CO
Pac-12 Women's Tournament
March 2, 2022; 2:30 pm, P12N	(8)	vs. (9) Arizona State; First Round	W 59–54	14–12	14 – Mack	5 – Tied	6 – von Oehloffen	Michelob Ultra Arena (3,044); Paradise, NV
March 3, 2022; 2:30 pm, P12N	(8)	vs. (1) No. 2 Stanford; Quarterfinals	L 44–57	14–13	13 – Tied	10 – Corosdale	4 – Brown	Michelob Ultra Arena (4,122); Paradise, NV
WNIT
March 17, 2022; 7:00 pm, Live Stream		Long Beach State; First Round	W 70–59	15–13	15 – Brown	12 – Brown	5 – Mack	Gill Coliseum (2,132); Corvallis, OR
March 20, 2022; 4:00 pm, Live Stream		Portland; Second Round	W 74–56	16–13	16 – Brown	12 – Mitrovic	4 – Tied	Gill Coliseum (2,204); Corvallis, OR
March 24, 2022; 7:00 pm, TBD		New Mexico; Third Round	W 78–73	17–13	25 – von Oelhoffen	11 – Mitrovic	6 – Corosdale	Gill Coliseum (2,535); Corvallis, OR
March 27, 2022; 12:00 pm, Live Stream		UCLA; Quarterfinals	L 66–74	17–14	19 – von Oelhoffen	8 – Corosdale	6 – Mack	Gill Coliseum (2,976); Corvallis, OR
*Non-conference game. ^{#}Rankings from AP Poll. (#) Tournament seedings in parentheses. All times are in Pacific Time.

== Rankings ==
Ranking movements Legend: ██ Increase in ranking ██ Decrease in ranking — = Not ranked
	Week																				
Poll	Pre	1	2	3	4	5	6	7	8	9	10	11	12	13	14	15	16	17	18	19	Final
AP	14	14*	15	16	23	23										—					Not released
Coaches	18	18*	18^	19	21	20															

*The preseason and week 1 polls were the same.
^Coaches did not release a week 2 poll.

== See also ==
- 2021–22 Oregon State Beavers men's basketball team
