= 2021–22 Washington Huskies women's basketball team =

American college basketball season

2021–22 Washington Huskies women's basketball
- Conference: Pac-12 Conference
- Record: 7–16 (2–12 Pac-12)
- Head coach: Tina Langley (1st season)
- Assistant coaches: Dan Tacheny; Katie Faulkner; Latara King
- Home arena: Alaska Airlines Arena

2021–22 Pac-12 Conference women's basketball standings
	Conf.				Overall
Team	W		L	PCT	W		L	PCT
No. 2 Stanford †	16	–	0	1.000	32	–	4	.889
Oregon	11	–	6	.647	20	–	12	.625
Washington State	11	–	6	.647	19	–	11	.633
No. 19 Arizona	10	–	6	.625	21	–	8	.724
Colorado	9	–	7	.563	22	–	9	.710
Utah	8	–	7	.533	21	–	12	.636
UCLA	8	–	8	.500	18	–	13	.581
Oregon State	6	–	9	.400	17	–	14	.548
Arizona State	4	–	9	.308	12	–	14	.462
USC	5	–	12	.294	12	–	16	.429
California	2	–	10	.167	11	–	13	.458
Washington	2	–	12	.143	7	–	16	.304
† 2022 Pac-12 Tournament winner Rankings from AP poll

The 2021–22 Washington Huskies women's basketball team represented the University of Washington during the 2021–22 NCAA Division I women's basketball season. The Huskies, led by first-year head coach Tina Langley, played their home games at Alaska Airlines Arena at Hec Edmundson Pavilion in Seattle, Washington and competed as members of the Pac-12 Conference.

== Offseason ==
=== Coaching change ===
On March 15, 2021 following a season with a 7–13 (3–13 Pac-12) record, Jody Wynn was fired as head coach. On April 5, Tina Langley was hired to replace Wynn as head coach.

=== Departures ===
Due to COVID-19 disruptions throughout NCAA sports in 2020–21, the NCAA announced that the 2020–21 season would not count against the athletic eligibility of any individual involved in an NCAA winter sport, including women's basketball. This meant that all seniors in 2020–21 had the option to return for 2021–22.

Washington departures
Name	Pos.	Height	Year	Hometown	Reason for departure

=== Incoming ===
Washington incoming transfers
Name	Pos.	Height	Year	Hometown	Previous school	Source
Nancy Mulkey	C	6' 9"	Senior	Cypress, TX	Rice	
Lauren Schwartz	F	5' 11"	Sophomore	Union, KY	Rice	
Trinity Oliver	G	5' 9"	Junior	Euless, TX	Baylor	

== Roster ==
2021–22 Washington Huskies women's basketball team
Players
Coaches

Pos.	#	Name	Height	Year	Previous school	Hometown
G	0	Jess Finney	6 ft 0 in (1.83 m)	Fr	Chaparral HS	Scottsdale, AZ
F	1	Marisa Davis-Jones	6 ft 1 in (1.85 m)	Fr	Valley Vista HS	Surprise, AZ
F	2	Lauren Schwartz	5 ft 11 in (1.8 m)	So	Larry A Ryle HS; Rice	Union, KY
C	3	Tameiya Sadler	6 ft 3 in (1.91 m)	So	Mount Spokane	Colbert, WA
F	11	Haley Van Dyke	6 ft 1 in (1.85 m)	Jr	Campolindo	Walnut Creek, CA
F	12	Olivia Pollerd	6 ft 2 in (1.88 m)	Fr	Centre of Excellence	Mount Martha, AUS
G	15	Nia Lowery	5 ft 11 in (1.8 m)	RS So	C. K. McClatchy	Sacramento, CA
F	23	Alexis Whitfield	6 ft 2 in (1.88 m)	Fr	Chaminade College Prep	West Hills, CA
G	25	T. T. Watkins	5 ft 11 in (1.8 m)	Jr	Walnut	Walnut, CA
C	32	Nancy Mulkey	6 ft 9 in (2.06 m)	Sr	Cypress HS; Oklahoma; Rice	Cypress, TX
G	33	Trinity Oliver	5 ft 9 in (1.75 m)	Jr	Trinity HS; Baylor	Euless, TX
G	35	Alexis Griggsby	5 ft 9 in (1.75 m)	Sr	Sierra Canyon	Northridge, CA
G	41	Callie Lind	5 ft 9 in (1.75 m)	So	Eastlake	Sammamish, WA
G	44	Missy Peterson	5 ft 11 in (1.8 m)	Sr	Edmonds-Woodway	Edmonds, WA
F	53	Darcy Rees	6 ft 4 in (1.93 m)	Jr	Adelaide	Adelaide, South Australia

Head coach

- Tina Langley (West Alabama)

Assistant coach(es)

- Dan Tacheny (UNLV)
- Katie Faulkner (Montana)
- Latara King (Florida Memorial)

Legend

- (C) Team captain
- (S) Suspended
- (I) Ineligible
- (W) Walk-on
- Injured
- Current redshirt

Roster
Last update: March 18, 2022

== Schedule ==
Date time, TV	Rank^{#}	Opponent^{#}	Result	Record	High points	High rebounds	High assists	Site (attendance) city, state
Regular season
November 12, 2021*; 7:00 pm, Live Stream		San Diego	W 57–51	1–0	13 – Peterson	10 – Van Dyke	3 – Tied	Alaska Airlines Arena (1,341); Seattle, WA
November 14, 2021*; 2:00 pm, Live Stream		Northern Arizona	W 72–65	2–0	19 – Van Dyke	13 – Van Dyke	7 – Peterson	Alaska Airlines Arena (1,275); Seattle, WA
November 20, 2021*; 2:00 pm, Live Stream		No. 10 Louisville	L 53–61	2–1	15 – Van Dyke	8 – Mulkey	3 – Tied	Alaska Airlines Arena (1,884); Seattle, WA
November 25, 2021*; 12:00 pm, FloHoops		vs. VCU; Goombay Splash	L 47–60	2–2	13 – Mulkey	11 – Van Dyke	3 – Griggsby	Gateway Christian Academy (200); Bimini, Bahamas
November 27, 2021*; 9:00 am, FloHoops		vs. North Carolina; Goombay Splash	L 37–58	2–3	8 – Griggsby	5 – Tied	4 – Schwartz	Gateway Christian Academy (100); Bimini, Bahamas
December 10, 2021*; 6:00 pm, ESPN+		at Seattle	W 77–59	3–3	23 – Griggsby	11 – Mulkey	6 – Mulkey	Redhawk Center (497); Seattle, WA
December 18, 2021*; 2:00 pm, Live Stream		Eastern Washington; Husky Classic	W 62–59	4–3	18 – Schwartz	9 – Tied	5 – Oliver	Alaska Airlines Arena (1,166); Seattle, WA
December 20, 2021*; 2:00 pm, Live Stream		Nevada; Husky Classic	W 58–42	5–3	20 – Van Dyke	9 – Van Dyke	3 – Peterson	Alaska Airlines Arena (1,054); Seattle, WA
December 31, 2021; 7:00 pm, P12N		No. 2 Stanford	Postponed due to COVID-19 protocols within the Washington program.					Alaska Airlines Arena; Seattle, WA
January 2, 2022; 12:00 pm, P12N		California	Postponed due to COVID-19 protocols within the Washington program.					Alaska Airlines Arena; Seattle, WA
January 7, 2022; 10:00 am, P12N		at Arizona State	Postponed due to COVID-19 protocols within the Washington program.					Desert Financial Arena; Tempe, AZ
January 9, 2022; 11:00 am, P12N		at No. 4 Arizona	Postponed due to COVID-19 protocols within the Washington program.					McKale Center; Tucson, AZ
January 14, 2022; 7:00 pm, P12N		at UCLA	L 48–63	5–4 (0–1)	15 – Van Dyke	6 – Mulkey	5 – Schwartz	Pauley Pavilion (0); Los Angeles, CA
January 16, 2022; 12:00 pm, P12N		at USC	L 66–73	5–5 (0–2)	26 – Mulkey	6 – Tied	6 – Schwartz	Galen Center (0); Los Angeles, CA
January 21, 2022; 7:00 pm, P12N		Oregon	L 61–68	5–6 (0–3)	18 – Schwartz	6 – Tied	4 – Schwartz	Alaska Airlines Arena (1,832); Seattle, WA
January 23, 2022; 12:00 pm, P12N		Oregon State	L 41–47	5–7 (0–4)	12 – Mulkey	8 – Van Dyke	3 – Tied	Alaska Airlines Arena (1,350); Seattle, WA
January 28, 2022; 7:00 pm, P12N		at Washington State; Apple Cup	L 56–60 ^{OT}	5–8 (0–5)	11 – Tied	13 – Van Dyke	5 – Peterson	Beasley Coliseum (1,145); Pullman, WA
January 30, 2022; 12:00 pm, P12N		Washington State; Apple Cup	L 43–57	5–9 (0–6)	17 – Van Dyke	10 – Mulkey	3 – Peterson	Alaska Airlines Arena (3,023); Seattle, WA
February 4, 2022; 6:00 pm, P12N		at Utah	L 66–71	5–10 (0–7)	18 – Peterson	8 – Van Dyke	3 – Tied	Jon M. Huntsman Center (2,046); Salt Lake City, UT
February 6, 2022; 11:00 am, P12N		at Colorado	L 43–66	5–11 (0–8)	16 – Mulkey	10 – Van Dyke	3 – Tied	CU Events Center (2,111); Boulder, CO
February 11, 2022; 7:00 pm, P12N		USC	L 59–70	5–12 (0–9)	16 – Schwartz	9 – Oliver	7 – Peterson	Alaska Airlines Arena (1,505); Seattle, WA
February 13, 2022; 12:00 pm, P12N		UCLA	L 61–69	5–13 (0–10)	17 – Schwartz	7 – Van Dyke	4 – Tied	Alaska Airlines Arena (1,472); Seattle, WA
February 18, 2022; 7:00 pm, P12N		No. 8 Arizona	L 42–51	5–14 (0–11)	13 – Mulkey	8 – Oliver	3 – Noble	Alaska Airlines Arena (1,499); Seattle, WA
February 20, 2022; 12:00 pm, P12N		Arizona State	W 74–69	6–14 (1–11)	18 – Van Dyke	7 – Van Dyke	3 – Tied	Alaska Airlines Arena (1,442); Seattle, WA
February 24, 2022; 7:00 pm, P12N		at California	W 61–60	7–14 (2–11)	20 – Van Dyke	11 – Van Dyke	4 – Tied	Haas Pavilion (1,609); Berkeley, CA
February 26, 2022; 12:00 pm, P12N		at No. 2 Stanford	L 55–63	7–15 (2–12)	16 – Schwartz	8 – Oliver	4 – Van Dyke	Maples Pavilion (3,777); Stanford, CA
Pac-12 Women's Tournament
March 2, 2022; 12:00 pm, P12N	(12)	vs. (5) Colorado; First Round	L 52–64	7–16	11 – Tied	7 – Tied	3 – Tied	Michelob Ultra Arena (3,044); Paradise, NV
*Non-conference game. ^{#}Rankings from AP Poll. (#) Tournament seedings in parentheses. All times are in Pacific Time.

== See also ==
- 2021–22 Washington Huskies men's basketball team
