= 2021–22 Utah Utes women's basketball team =

Intercollegiate basketball season

2021–22 Utah Utes women's basketball

NCAA tournament, second round
- Conference: Pac-12 Conference
- Record: 21–12 (8–7 Pac–12)
- Head coach: Lynne Roberts (7th season)
- Associate head coach: Gavin Petersen
- Assistant coaches: Jerise Freeman; Joanna Reitz
- Home arena: Jon M. Huntsman Center

2021–22 Pac-12 Conference women's basketball standings
	Conf.				Overall
Team	W		L	PCT	W		L	PCT
No. 2 Stanford †	16	–	0	1.000	32	–	4	.889
Oregon	11	–	6	.647	20	–	12	.625
Washington State	11	–	6	.647	19	–	11	.633
No. 19 Arizona	10	–	6	.625	21	–	8	.724
Colorado	9	–	7	.563	22	–	9	.710
Utah	8	–	7	.533	21	–	12	.636
UCLA	8	–	8	.500	18	–	13	.581
Oregon State	6	–	9	.400	17	–	14	.548
Arizona State	4	–	9	.308	12	–	14	.462
USC	5	–	12	.294	12	–	16	.429
California	2	–	10	.167	11	–	13	.458
Washington	2	–	12	.143	7	–	16	.304
† 2022 Pac-12 Tournament winner Rankings from AP poll

The 2021–22 Utah Utes women's basketball team represented the University of Utah during the 2021–22 NCAA Division I women's basketball season. The Utes, led by seventh-year head coach Lynne Roberts, played their home games at the Jon M. Huntsman Center and competed as members of the Pac-12 Conference.

== Previous season ==
The Utes finished the season with a record of 5–16, and a 4–15 record in Pac-12 play to finish in tenth place. They lost in the first round of the Pac-12 women's tournament to Washington State. They did not qualify for the NCAA or WNIT tournaments.

== Roster ==
2021–22 Utah Utes women's basketball team
Players
Coaches

Pos.	#	Name	Height	Year	Previous school	Hometown
G	1	Isabel Palmer	5 ft 9 in (1.75 m)	Jr	BA Centre of Excellence	Newcastle, Australia
G	2	Ines Vieira	5 ft 6 in (1.68 m)	Fr	Quinta Lombos	Madeira Island, Portugal
F	3	Andreas Torres	6 ft 2 in (1.88 m)	Sr	Montmorency (CEGEP)	Terrebonne, QC
G	5	Gianna Kneepkens	5 ft 11 in (1.8 m)	Fr	Duluth Marshall HS	Duluth, MN
G	10	Dru Gylten	5 ft 11 in (1.8 m)	Sr	St. Thomas More HS	Rapid City, SD
G	11	Brynna Maxwell	6 ft 0 in (1.83 m)	Jr	Gig Harbor HS	Gig Harbor, WA
G	15	Kemery Martin	6 ft 0 in (1.83 m)	Jr	Corner Canyon HS	Sandy, UT
F	22	Jenna Johnson	6 ft 2 in (1.88 m)	Fr	Wayzata HS	Medina, MN
G	23	Maka Jackson	5 ft 9 in (1.75 m)	Sr	Stonewall Jackson; South Georgia Technical College; Texas Tech	Ewa Beach, HI
G	24	Kennady McQueen	5 ft 10 in (1.78 m)	So	North Summit High School	Henefer, UT
F	34	Dasia Young	5 ft 11 in (1.8 m)	Jr	Nettleton HS; UT Martin	Jonesboro, AR
F	42	Peyton McFarland	6 ft 4 in (1.93 m)	So	Boise HS	Boise, ID
F	53	Kelsey Rees	6 ft 5 in (1.96 m)	So	BA Centre of Excellence	Glenelg, Australia

Head coach

- Lynne Roberts (Seattle Pacific)

Assistant coach(es)

- Gavin Petersen (Hawaiʻi)
- Jerise Freeman (Pacific)
- Joanna Reitz (Covenant)

Legend

- (C) Team captain
- (S) Suspended
- (I) Ineligible
- (W) Walk-on
- Injured
- Current redshirt

Roster
Last update: March 15, 2022

== Schedule and results ==
Date time, TV	Rank^{#}	Opponent^{#}	Result	Record	High points	High rebounds	High assists	Site (attendance) city, state
Exhibition
October 29, 2021; 7:00 pm		Westminster (Utah)	W 93–48	0–0	– – –	– – –	– – –	Jon M. Huntsman Center (371); Salt Lake City, UT
Non-conference regular season
Nov 10, 2021; 7:00 pm, Live Stream		Lipscomb	W 105–56	1–0	24 – Maxwell	9 – Gylten	6 – Gylten	Jon M. Huntsman Center (1,732); Salt Lake City, UT
Nov 13, 2021; 12:00 pm, Live Stream		Xavier	W 106–71	2–0	21 – Johnson	7 – Johnson	7 – Gylten	Jon M. Huntsman Center (1,631); Salt Lake City, UT
Nov 16, 2021; 7:00 pm, Live Stream		Saint Mary's (CA)	W 92–50	3–0	22 – Johnson	6 – Tied	8 – Vieira	Jon M. Huntsman Center (1,645); Salt Lake City, UT
Nov 19, 2021; 7:00 pm, Live Stream		Cincinnati	W 78–45	4–0	15 – McQueen	12 – Young	5 – Vieira	Jon M. Huntsman Center (1,842); Salt Lake City, UT
Nov 26, 2021; 3:00 pm		vs. Gonzaga; Rainbow Wahine Showdown	L 71–89	4–1	15 – Kneepkens	4 – Johnson	9 – Gylten	Stan Sheriff Center; Manoa, HI
Nov 27, 2021; 5:30 pm		at Hawaii; Rainbow Wahine Showdown	W 73–57	5–1	23 – Maxwell	7 – Gylten	5 – Gylten	Stan Sheriff Center (1,026); Manoa, HI
Nov 28, 2021; 3:00 pm		vs. Eastern Illinois; Rainbow Wahine Showdown	W 93–77	6–1	22 – Johnson	6 – Johnson	7 – Young	Stan Sheriff Center; Manoa, HI
December 4, 2021; 5:00 pm, P12N		No. 21 BYU; Deseret First Duel	L 80–85	6–2	29 – Kneepkens	6 – McQueen	8 – Gylten	Jon M. Huntsman Center (3,218); Salt Lake City, UT
December 10, 2021; 7:00 pm, Live Stream		Cal State Fullerton	W 100–45	7–2	23 – Johnson	10 – Johnson	6 – Vieira	Jon M. Huntsman Center (1,817); Salt Lake City, UT
December 18, 2021; 2:00 pm, Live Stream		Utah Valley	W 65–57	8–2	21 – Johnson	14 – Johnson	5 – Gylten	Jon M. Huntsman Center (2,003); Salt Lake City, UT
December 21, 2021; 5:00 pm, BSOK		at Oklahoma	L 76–83	8–3	19 – Kneepkens	11 – McFarland	10 – Gylten	Lloyd Noble Center (1,705); Norman, OK
January 14, 2022; 2:00 pm		UC Riverside	W 89–48	9–3	18 – Johnson	7 – McFarland	6 – Gylten	Jon M. Huntsman Center (1,554); Salt Lake City, UT
Pac-12 regular season
January 16, 2022; 12:00 pm, P12N		No. 2 Stanford	L 73–83	9–4 (0–1)	15 – Johnson	5 – McQueen	6 – Gylten	Jon M. Huntsman Center (1,911); Salt Lake City, UT
January 21, 2022; 7:00 pm, P12N		at No. 10 Arizona	L 64–76	9–5 (0–2)	15 – Kneepkens	6 – Tied	6 – Gylten	McKale Center (7,099); Tucson, AZ
January 23, 2022; 2:00 pm, P12N		at Arizona State	W 72–63	10–5 (1–2)	20 – Kneepkens	6 – McFarland	3 – Tied	Desert Financial Arena (2,201); Tempe, AZ
January 26, 2022 (Note: This game was originally scheduled on December 31 before being postponed and rescheduled to January 26 due to COVID-19 protocols within the Utah program.); 12:00 pm, P12N		at No. 19 Oregon	L 66–70	10–6 (1–3)	17 – Kneepkens	7 – Rees	2 – Tied	Matthew Knight Arena (7,075); Eugene, OR
January 28, 2022; 7:00 pm, P12N		Colorado	L 62–66 ^{OT}	10–7 (1–4)	18 – Young	7 – McQueen	6 – Gylten	Jon M. Huntsman Center (2,165); Salt Lake City, UT
January 30, 2022; 12:00 pm, P12N		at Colorado	W 78–67	11–7 (2–4)	15 – Young	8 – Vieira	4 – Vieira	CU Events Center (1,921); Boulder, CO
February 4, 2022; 7:00 pm, P12N		Washington	W 71–66	12–7 (3–4)	17 – McFarland	5 – McFarland	3 – Tied	Jon M. Huntsman Center (2,046); Salt Lake City, UT
February 6, 2022; 12:00 pm, P12N		Washington State	W 72–66	13–7 (4–4)	12 – Maxwell	11 – Rees	4 – Rees	Jon M. Huntsman Center (2,043); Salt Lake City, UT
February 9, 2022 (Note: This game was originally scheduled on January 9 before being postponed and rescheduled to February 9 due to COVID-19 protocols within the Utah program.); 2:00 pm, Live Stream		USC	W 91–69	14–7 (5–4)	22 – McQueen	7 – Rees	6 – Palmer	Jon M. Huntsman Center (1,810); Salt Lake City, UT
February 11, 2022; 8:00 pm, P12N		at No. 2 Stanford	L 64–91	14–8 (5–5)	12 – Tied	4 – Tied	3 – Gylten	Maples Pavilion (3,044); Stanford, CA
February 13, 2022; 2:00 pm, P12N		at California	W 80–75 ^{OT}	15–8 (6–5)	21 – Kneepkens	10 – Rees	5 – Gylten	Haas Pavilion (1,066); Berkeley, CA
February 18, 2022; 8:00 pm, P12N		at USC	L 62–83	15–9 (6–6)	15 – Kneepkens	5 – Tied	2 – Tied	Galen Center (689); Los Angeles, CA
February 20, 2022; 1:00 pm, P12N		at UCLA	W 75–70	16–9 (7–6)	20 – Johnson	6 – McFarland	3 – Gylten	Pauley Pavilion (1,630); Los Angeles, CA
February 24, 2022; 5:30 pm, P12N		Oregon State	W 70–58	17–9 (8–6)	12 – Tied	7 – Tied	7 – Gylten	Jon M. Huntsman Center (2,104); Salt Lake City, UT
February 26, 2022; 1:00 pm, P12N		No. 25 Oregon	L 65–73	17–10 (8–7)	27 – Johnson	5 – Maxwell	5 – Gylten	Jon M. Huntsman Center (2,207); Salt Lake City, UT
Pac-12 Women's Tournament
March 2, 2022; 9:30 pm, P12N	(6)	vs. (11) California; First Round	W 66–60	18–10	20 – Kneepkens	5 – Tied	6 – Gylten	Michelob Ultra Arena (3,010); Paradise, NV
March 3, 2022; 9:30 pm, P12N	(6)	vs. (3) Washington State; Quarterfinals	W 70–59	19–10	19 – Johnson	8 – Rees	2 – Tied	Michelob Ultra Arena (4,428); Paradise, NV
March 4, 2022; 9:30 pm, P12N	(6)	vs. (2) Oregon; Semifinals	W 80–73	20–10	24 – Kneepkens	11 – McQueen	5 – Tied	Michelob Ultra Arena (4,917); Paradise, NV
March 6, 2022; 4:00 pm, ESPN2	(6)	vs. (1) No. 2 Stanford; Championship	L 48–73	20–11	16 – Maxwell	10 – Rees	5 – Gylten	Michelob Ultra Arena (4,709); Paradise, NV
NCAA tournament
March 18, 2022*; 3:30 pm, ESPNews	(7 S)	vs. (10 S) Arkansas; First Round	W 92–69	21–11	20 – McQueen	10 – Rees	11 – Gylten	Frank Erwin Center (3,822); Austin, TX
March 20, 2022*; 3:00 pm, ESPN	(7 S)	at (2 S) No. 6 Texas; Second Round	L 56–78	21–12	18 – McQueen	4 – McQueen	5 – Gylten	Frank Erwin Center (4,960); Austin, TX
*Non-conference game. ^{#}Rankings from AP Poll. (#) Tournament seedings in parentheses. S=Spokane. All times are in Mountain Time.

== Rankings ==
Ranking movements Legend: ██ Increase in ranking ██ Decrease in ranking — = Not ranked RV = Received votes
	Week																				
Poll	Pre	1	2	3	4	5	6	7	8	9	10	11	12	13	14	15	16	17	18	19	Final
AP	—	—*	—	—	—	—	—	—	—	—	—	—	—	—	—	—	—	—	RV	—	Not released
Coaches	—	—*	—^	RV	—	—	—	—	—	—	—	—	—	—	RV	RV	RV	RV	RV	RV	RV

*The preseason and week 1 polls were the same.
^Coaches did not release a week 2 poll.

== See also ==
- 2021–22 Utah Utes men's basketball team
