= 2021–22 UCLA Bruins women's basketball team =

Intercollegiate basketball season

2021–22 UCLA Bruins women's basketball

WNIT, semifinals
- Conference: Pac-12 Conference
- Record: 18–13 (8–8 Pac-12)
- Head coach: Cori Close (11th season)
- Associate head coach: Shannon Perry-LeBeauf
- Assistant coaches: Tasha Brown; Tony Newnan
- Home arena: Pauley Pavilion (Capacity: 13,800)

2021–22 Pac-12 Conference women's basketball standings
	Conf.				Overall
Team	W		L	PCT	W		L	PCT
No. 2 Stanford †	16	–	0	1.000	32	–	4	.889
Oregon	11	–	6	.647	20	–	12	.625
Washington State	11	–	6	.647	19	–	11	.633
No. 19 Arizona	10	–	6	.625	21	–	8	.724
Colorado	9	–	7	.563	22	–	9	.710
Utah	8	–	7	.533	21	–	12	.636
UCLA	8	–	8	.500	18	–	13	.581
Oregon State	6	–	9	.400	17	–	14	.548
Arizona State	4	–	9	.308	12	–	14	.462
USC	5	–	12	.294	12	–	16	.429
California	2	–	10	.167	11	–	13	.458
Washington	2	–	12	.143	7	–	16	.304
† 2022 Pac-12 Tournament winner Rankings from AP poll

The 2021–22 UCLA Bruins women's basketball team represented the University of California, Los Angeles during the 2021–22 NCAA Division I women's basketball season. The Bruins were led by eleventh-year head coach Cori Close. They played their home games at Pauley Pavilion and competed as members of the Pac-12 Conference.

The Bruins were invited to the WNIT as the automatic qualifier for the Pac-12 Conference. It was the Bruins' first WNIT appearance since 2015, when they were WNIT champions. The season was impacted by a number of games postponed, cancelled, or forfeited.

== Previous season ==
The Bruins finished the season 17–6, 12–4 in Pac-12 play to finish in third place. As the third seed in the Pac-12 women's tournament they advanced to the championship game where they lost to Stanford. As a three seed in the NCAA tournament, the Bruins managed to beat Wyoming in the 1st round, but then they lost to Texas in the second round to end their season.

== Offseason ==
=== Departures ===
Due to COVID-19 disruptions throughout NCAA sports in 2020–21, the NCAA announced that the 2020–21 season would not count against the athletic eligibility of any individual involved in an NCAA winter sport, including women's basketball. This meant that all seniors in 2020–21 had the option to return for 2021–22.

UCLA Departures
Name	Pos.	Height	Year	Hometown	Reason for departure
Lindsay Corsaro	G	6'1"	(redshirt) Junior	Indianapolis, IN	Graduated
Michaela Onyenwere	F	6'0"	Senior	Aurora, CO	Graduated; selected 6th overall by the New York Liberty in the 2021 WNBA draft
Lauryn Miller	F	6'1"	Senior	Kirkwood, MO	Graduated

=== Incoming transfers ===
Name	Num	Pos.	Height	Year	Hometown	Previous school
Gina Conti	10	G	5'11"	Graduate Student	Grove City, OH	Wake Forest
IImar'I Thomas	24	F	5'10"	Graduate Student	Oakland, CA	Cincinnati
Jaelynn Penn	31	G	5'10"	Graduate Student	Louisville, KY	Indiana
Angela Dugalić	32	F	6'4"	Sophomore	Des Plaines, IL	Oregon

== Preseason ==
- October 12, 2021 – The Bruins were picked to finish third in both the 2021-22 Pac-12 Preseason Media and Coaches Polls, behind Stanford and Oregon
- October 25, 2021 – Gina Conti was named to the Nancy Lieberman Award top 20 watch list (Top point guard)
- October 26, 2021 – Charisma Osborne was named to the Ann Meyers Drysdale Award top 20 watch list (Best shooting guard)
- November 3, 2021 – Preseason All-Pac-12 team: Charisma Osborne; Gina Conti and Natalie Chou (Honorable mention)
- November 9, 2021 – Charisma Osborne was named to three watch lists (Wade Trophy, Wooden Award, and Naismith Trophy)

== Roster ==
2021–22 UCLA Bruins women's basketball team
Players
Coaches

Pos.	#	Name	Height	Year	Previous school	Hometown
G	0	Chantel Horvat	6 ft 2 in (1.88 m)	RS Sr	Geelong College	Geelong, Australia
G	1	Kayla Owens	6 ft 1 in (1.85 m)	RS Sr	Langham Creek	Houston, TX
G	2	Dominique Onu	5 ft 9 in (1.75 m)	RS Fr	Blair Academy	Jacksonville, FL
G	3	Kiara Jefferson	5 ft 9 in (1.75 m)	Sr	West Campus	Sacramento, CA
F	5	Brynn Masikewich	6 ft 3 in (1.91 m)	Jr	Lincoln Prep	Calgary, Alberta
G	10	Gina Conti (injured) (redshirt)	5 ft 11 in (1.8 m)	GS	Grove City High; Wake Forest	Grove City, OH
F	11	Emily Bessoir (injured)	6 ft 4 in (1.93 m)	RS Fr	Wilhelm-Hausenstein Gymnasium	Munich, Germany
G	20	Charisma Osborne	5 ft 9 in (1.75 m)	Jr	Windward School	Moreno Valley, CA
G	23	Natalie Chou	6 ft 1 in (1.85 m)	GS	Plano West; Baylor	Plano, TX
F	24	IImar'I Thomas	5 ft 10 in (1.78 m)	GS	Sacred Heart Cathedral Prep; Cincinnati	Oakland, CA
G	31	Jaelynn Penn	5 ft 10 in (1.78 m)	GS	Butler Traditional; Indiana	Louisville, KY
F	32	Angela Dugalić	6 ft 4 in (1.93 m)	RS Fr	Maine West; Oregon	Des Plaines, IL
G	35	Camryn Brown	5 ft 11 in (1.8 m)	Jr	Prestonwood Christian	Lewisville, TX
F	43	Izzy Anstey	6 ft 4 in (1.93 m)	RS Fr	Caulfield	Melbourne, Australia
G	51	Eliana Sigal (W)	5 ft 10 in (1.78 m)	Sr	Tarbut V' Torah	Irvine, CA

Head coach

- Cori Close (UC Santa Barbara)

Assistant coach(es)

- Shannon Perry-LeBeauf (Iowa)
- Tony Newnan (UC Santa Barbara)
- Tasha Brown (St. Ambrose)

Legend

- (C) Team captain
- (S) Suspended
- (I) Ineligible
- (W) Walk-on
- Injured
- Current redshirt

Roster
Last update: August 24, 2021

== Schedule ==
Date time, TV	Rank^{#}	Opponent^{#}	Result	Record	High points	High rebounds	High assists	Site (attendance) city, state
Regular Season
November 10, 2021*; 7:00 pm, P12N	No. 20	Pepperdine	W 78–69	1–0	24 – Osborne	7 – Thomas	4 – Osborne	Pauley Pavilion (1,363); Los Angeles, CA
November 18, 2021*; 7:00 pm, live stream	No. 20	Cal State Northridge	W 73–46	2–0	21 – Thomas	9 – Anstey	7 – Penn	Pauley Pavilion (794); Los Angeles, CA
November 21, 2021*; 3:00 pm, P12N	No. 20	Virginia	W 69–57	3–0	20 – Chou	6 – Owens	7 – Penn	Pauley Pavilion (1,077); Los Angeles, CA
November 26, 2021*; 10:30 am, FloHoops	No. 19	vs. Kent State; Gulf Coast Showcase	L 69–75	3–1	21 – Osborne	8 – Penn	3 – Tied	Hertz Arena (150); Estero, FL
November 27, 2021*; 8:00 am, FloHoops	No. 19	vs. South Dakota State; Gulf Coast Showcase consolation	L 66–76	3–2	18 – Thomas	7 – Tied	2 – Tied	Hertz Arena (213); Estero, FL
November 28, 2021*; 8:00 am, FloHoops	No. 19	vs. St. John's (NY); Gulf Coast Showcase seventh place	W 73–65	4–2	19 – Tied	11 – Osborne	6 – Osborne	Hertz Arena (143); Estero, FL
December 5, 2021*; 2:00 pm, live stream		San Jose State	W 112–33	5–2	32 – Thomas	9 – Owens	11 – Chou	Pauley Pavilion (1,362); Los Angeles, CA
December 11, 2021*; 10:00 am, ABC		vs. No. 3 UConn; Never Forget Tribute Classic	L 61–71	5–3	26 – Osborne	8 – Anstey	3 – Penn	Prudential Center (9,236); Newark, NJ
December 16, 2021*; 7:00 pm, live stream		Texas Southern	Canceled due to COVID-19 protocols within the UCLA program (Note: This game was canceled on December 16 due to COVID-19 protocols within the Bruins program. This game was declared a no contest by the NCAA.)					Pauley Pavilion; Los Angeles, CA
December 19, 2021*; 5:00 pm, P12N		Ohio State	Canceled due to COVID-19 protocols within the UCLA program (Note: This game was canceled on December 18 due to COVID-19 protocols within the Bruins program. This game was declared a no contest by the NCAA.)					Pauley Pavilion; Los Angeles, CA
December 21, 2021*; 1:00 pm, live stream		Cal State Bakersfield	Canceled due to COVID-19 protocols within the UCLA program (Note: This game was canceled on December 18 due to COVID-19 protocols within the Bruins program. This game was declared a no contest by the NCAA.)					Pauley Pavilion; Los Angeles, CA
December 31, 2021; 6:00 pm, P12N		Arizona State	Canceled due to COVID-19 protocols within the UCLA program (Note: This game was postponed on December 24 due to COVID-19 protocols within the Bruins program.)					Pauley Pavilion; Los Angeles, CA
January 7, 2022; 6:00 pm, P12N		at Utah	Canceled due to COVID-19 protocols within the Utah program (Note: This game was postponed on January 4 due to COVID-19 protocols within the Utes program.)					Jon M. Huntsman Center; Salt Lake City, UT
January 9, 2022; 10:00 am, P12N		at Colorado	L 63–71	5–4 (0–1)	15 – Chou	13 – Anstey	5 – Chou	CU Events Center (1,652); Boulder, CO
January 14, 2022; 7:00 pm, P12N		Washington	W 63–48	6–4 (1–1)	25 – Thomas	8 – Penn	6 – Onu	Pauley Pavilion (0); Los Angeles, CA
January 16, 2022; 12:00 pm, P12N		Washington State	W 71–58	7–4 (2–1)	25 – Osborne	10 – Owens	4 – Osborne	Pauley Pavilion (0); Los Angeles, CA
January 20, 2022; 6:30 pm, P12N		USC; Rivalry	W 66–43	8–4 (3–1)	20 – Thomas	7 – Thomas	7 – Osborne	Pauley Pavilion (0); Los Angeles, CA
January 23, 2022; 6:00 pm, P12N		at USC; Rivalry	W 68–58	9–4 (4–1)	27 – Osborne	9 – Anstey	7 – Thomas	Galen Center (1,892); Los Angeles, CA
January 26, 2022 (Note: This game was originally scheduled for January 2, but was postponed on December 24 due to COVID-19 protocols within the UCLA program. On January 19, it was announced that the game was rescheduled for January 26.); 5:00 pm, P12N		No. 8 Arizona	L 63–74	9–5 (4–2)	14 – Thomas	10 – Onu	5 – Onu	Pauley Pavilion (826); Los Angeles, CA
January 28, 2022 (Note: This game was ruled a forfeit by UCLA due to injuries unrelated to COVID-19.); 8:00 pm, P12N		at No. 19 Oregon	Forfeited to Oregon due to excess non-COVID injuries within the UCLA program.					Matthew Knight Arena; Eugene, OR
January 30, 2022; 2:00 pm, P12N		at Oregon State	L 58–72	9–6 (4–4)	13 – Tied	7 – Onu	4 – Thomas	Gill Coliseum (4,341); Corvallis, OR
February 3, 2022; 7:00 pm, ESPN		No. 2 Stanford; Blue Out	L 48–76	9–7 (4–5)	12 – Osborne	8 – Owens	6 – Thomas	Pauley Pavilion (2,100); Los Angeles, CA
February 6, 2022; 12:00 pm, P12N		California	W 59–54	10–7 (5–5)	16 – Thomas	12 – Thomas	4 – Osborne	Pauley Pavilion (1,620); Los Angeles, CA
February 11, 2022; 7:00 pm, P12N		at Washington State	L 65–66	10–8 (5–6)	23 – Osborne	6 – Thomas	3 – Tied	Beasley Coliseum (1,120); Pullman, WA
February 13, 2022; 12:00 pm, P12N		at Washington	W 69–61	11–8 (6–6)	22 – Osborne	9 – Horvat	5 – Osborne	Alaska Airlines Arena (1,472); Seattle, WA
February 16, 2022 (Note: This game was added on February 8 to make up for the forfeiture earlier this season. This game will only count against the overall record.)*; 4:00 pm, P12N		at Oregon	L 53–67	11–9	16 – Tied	9 – Thomas	3 – Horvat	Matthew Knight Arena (7,223); Eugene, OR
February 18, 2022; 7:00 pm, P12N		Colorado	L 54–67	11–10 (6–7)	17 – Thomas	8 – Thomas	6 – Osborne	Pauley Pavilion (2,204); Los Angeles, CA
February 20, 2022; 12:00 pm, P12N		Utah	L 70–75	11–11 (6–8)	20 – Thomas	9 – Thomas	3 – Tied	Pauley Pavilion (1,630); Los Angeles, CA
February 24, 2022; 6:00 pm, P12N		at No. 12 Arizona	W 64–46	12–11 (7–8)	17 – Osborne	11 – Thomas	4 – Chou	McKale Center (8,067); Tucson, AZ
February 26, 2022; 11:00 am, P12N		at Arizona State	W 59–52	13–11 (8–8)	17 – Osborne	10 – Horvat	4 – Tied	Desert Financial Arena (2,176); Tempe, AZ
Pac-12 Women's Tournament
March 2, 2022; 6:00 pm, P12N	(7)	vs. (10) USC; First Round	W 73–60	14–11	18 – Thomas	12 – Dugalić	3 – Osborne	Michelob Ultra Arena (3,010); Paradise, NV
March 3, 2022; 6:00 pm, P12N	(7)	vs. (2) Oregon; Quarterfinals	L 60–63	14–12	18 – Tied	7 – Osborne	8 – Osborne	Michelob Ultra Arena (4,428); Paradise, NV
WNIT
March 18, 2022*; 6:50 pm, Live Stream		UC Irvine; First Round	W 61–48	15–12	19 – Chou	11 – Thomas	4 – Osborne	Pauley Pavilion (1,415); Los Angeles, CA
March 20, 2022*; 2:00 pm, Live Stream		Air Force; Second Round	W 61–45	16–12	17 – Thomas	7 – Dugalić	3 – Osborne	Pauley Pavilion (1,050); Los Angeles, CA
March 24, 2022*; 5:30 pm, MW Network		at Wyoming; Third Round	W 82–81 ^{3OT}	17–12	20 – Osborne	10 – Thomas	5 – Osborne	Arena-Auditorium (4,297); Laramie, WY
March 27, 2022; 12:00 pm, Live Stream		at Oregon State; Quarterfinals	W 74–66	18–12	31 – Osborne	10 – Osborne	4 – Osborne	Gill Coliseum (2,976); Corvallis, OR
March 31, 2022*; 5:00 pm, ESPN3		at South Dakota State; Semifinals	L 59–62	18–13	24 – Thomas	6 – Horvat	8 – Osborne	Frost Arena (5,227); Brookings, SD
*Non-conference game. ^{#}Rankings from AP Poll. (#) Tournament seedings in parentheses. All times are in Pacific Time.

== Rankings ==
Ranking movements Legend: ██ Increase in ranking ██ Decrease in ranking — = Not ranked RV = Received votes
	Week																				
Poll	Pre	1	2	3	4	5	6	7	8	9	10	11	12	13	14	15	16	17	18	19	Final
AP	20	20*	20	19	RV	RV	RV	—	—	—	—	—	RV	—	—	—	—				Not released
Coaches	14	14*	14^	15	24	25	RV	RV	RV	RV	—	—	RV								RV

*The preseason and week 1 polls were the same.
^Coaches did not release a week 2 poll.

== Awards and honors ==
Recipient	Award (PAC-12 Conference)	Stats (PPG/RPG/FG%)	Week	Date awarded	Ref.
Natalie Chou	Player of the Week	31.0/6.0/68.8	November 29-December 5	December 6, 2021	
Charisma Osborne	Player of the Week		January 17 – January 23	January 24, 2022	
Charisma Osborne	Player of the Week		February 21 – February 27	February 28, 2022	
Charisma Osborne	All-Pac-12 team		–	March 1, 2022	
IImar'I Thomas	All-Pac-12 team		–	March 1, 2022	
Charisma Osborne	All-Defensive, Honorable Mention		–	March 1, 2022	
Izzy Anstey	All-Freshman, Honorable Mention		–	March 1, 2022	

- January 5, 2022 – Charisma Osborne named to the mid-season top 25 John R. Wooden Award watch list
- January 31, 2022 – Charisma Osborne was named to the John R. Wooden Award's late season top 20 watch list
- February 8, 2022 – Charisma Osborne was selected to the Ann Meyers-Drysdale Award top 10 watch list and to the Jersey Mike's Naismith Trophy midseason team
- April 4, 2022 – IImar'I Thomas named to the WNIT All-Tournament team

== Statistics ==
Updated through February 26, 2022

Record	UCLA	OPP
Scoring	1594	1480
Scoring Average	66.4	61.7
Field goals - Att	582–1433	509–1305
3-pt. Field Goals - Att	147–437	168–451
Free Throws - Att	283–366	294–410
Rebounds	878	792
Assists	331	298
Turnovers	323	358
Steals	153	162
