= 2021–22 Colorado Buffaloes women's basketball team =

Intercollegiate basketball season

2021–22 Colorado Buffaloes women's basketball

NCAA tournament, first round
- Conference: Pac-12 Conference
- Record: 22–9 (9–7 Pac-12)
- Head coach: JR Payne (6th season)
- Assistant coaches: Toriano Towns; Alex Earl; Shandrika Lee
- Home arena: CU Events Center

2021–22 Pac-12 Conference women's basketball standings
	Conf.				Overall
Team	W		L	PCT	W		L	PCT
No. 2 Stanford †	16	–	0	1.000	32	–	4	.889
Oregon	11	–	6	.647	20	–	12	.625
Washington State	11	–	6	.647	19	–	11	.633
No. 19 Arizona	10	–	6	.625	21	–	8	.724
Colorado	9	–	7	.563	22	–	9	.710
Utah	8	–	7	.533	21	–	12	.636
UCLA	8	–	8	.500	18	–	13	.581
Oregon State	6	–	9	.400	17	–	14	.548
Arizona State	4	–	9	.308	12	–	14	.462
USC	5	–	12	.294	12	–	16	.429
California	2	–	10	.167	11	–	13	.458
Washington	2	–	12	.143	7	–	16	.304
† 2022 Pac-12 Tournament winner Rankings from AP poll

The 2021–22 Colorado Buffaloes women's basketball team represented the University of Colorado Boulder during the 2021–22 NCAA Division I women's basketball season. The Buffaloes, led by sixth year head coach JR Payne, played their home games at the CU Events Center and competed as members of the Pac-12 Conference.

The Buffaloes were the last undefeated DI women's college basketball in the 2021-22 season, losing their first game to #2 Stanford on January 14, 2022.

== Previous season ==
The Buffaloes finished the season 12–11, 8–8 in Pac-12 play to finish in sixth place. As the sixth seed in the Pac-12 women's tournament they lost to Washington in the First Round. They received an invitation to the WNIT where they defeated Louisiana in the first round and Nebraska in the second round before losing to Ole Miss in the quarterfinals.

== Roster ==
2021–22 Colorado Buffaloes women's basketball team
Players
Coaches

Pos.	#	Name	Height	Year	Previous school	Hometown
G	00	Jaylyn Sherrod	5 ft 7 in (1.7 m)	Jr	Rasmay	Birmingham, AL
G	1	Tayanna Jones	6 ft 1 in (1.85 m)	Sr	North Johnston; Rend Lake College	Selma, NC
G	2	Tameiya Sadler	5 ft 8 in (1.73 m)	So	St. Patrick-St. Vincent	Vallejo, CA
G	3	Frida Formann	5 ft 11 in (1.8 m)	Fr	Falkonergårdens Gymnasium	Bagsværd, Denmark
G	4	Lesila Finau	5 ft 10 in (1.78 m)	Jr	Dublin	Dublin, CA
F	5	Kennedy Taylor	6 ft 3 in (1.91 m)	Fr	Shawnee Mission Northwest	Shawnee Mission, KS
C	11	Quay Miller	6 ft 3 in (1.91 m)	Jr	Kentridge	Renton, WA
G	13	Kylee Blacksten	6 ft 3 in (1.91 m)	Fr	Air Academy	Colorado Springs, CO
G	15	Kindyll Wetta	5 ft 9 in (1.75 m)	Fr	Valor Christian	Castle Rock, CO
C	20	Maura Singer	6 ft 4 in (1.93 m)	RS Fr	Columbine	Littleton, CO
G/F	21	Mya Hollingshed	6 ft 3 in (1.91 m)	Sr	Bellaire	Houston, TX
G	24	Aubrey Knight	6 ft 0 in (1.83 m)	Jr	Ventura	Ventura, CA
F	33	Sirena Tuitele	6 ft 1 in (1.85 m)	Jr	Pleasant Valley	Chico, CA
G	44	Sophie Gerber	6 ft 0 in (1.83 m)	Fr	Desert Mountain	Scottsdale, AZ
F	45	Charlotte Whittaker	6 ft 3 in (1.91 m)	So	St Andrew's College	Ventura, CA

Head coach

- JR Payne (Saint Mary's)

Assistant coach(es)

- Toriano Towns (Saint Mary's)
- Alex Earl (Arizona State)
- Shandrika Lee (Pepperdine)

Legend

- (C) Team captain
- (S) Suspended
- (I) Ineligible
- (W) Walk-on
- Injured
- Current redshirt

Roster
Last update: March 14, 2022

== Schedule ==
Date time, TV	Rank^{#}	Opponent^{#}	Result	Record	High points	High rebounds	High assists	Site (attendance) city, state
Exhibition
November 1, 2021*; 7:00 pm		Colorado Mines	W 63–52	–	9 – Sherrod	6 – Tied	4 – Wetta	CU Events Center (437); Boulder, CO
Regular season
November 10, 2021*; 5:30 pm, ESPN+		at Oklahoma State	W 55–45	1–0	15 – Hollingshed	8 – Tuitele	6 – Sherrod	Gallagher-Iba Arena (1,575); Stillwater, OK
November 14, 2021*; 2:00 pm, MW Network		at Air Force	W 58–53	2–0	17 – Miller	7 – Tied	3 – Sherrod	Clune Arena (423); Colorado Springs, CO
November 19, 2021*; 7:00 pm, Live Stream		Marquette	W 69–53	3–0	22 – Hollingshed	10 – Hollingshed	2 – Tied	CU Events Center (1,227); Boulder, CO
November 22, 2021*; 6:00 pm, Live Stream		Samford	W 81–48	4–0	13 – Formann	6 – Tied	9 – Wetta	CU Events Center (878); Boulder, CO
November 23, 2021*; 6:00 pm, Live Stream		Texas Southern	W 79–47	5–0	20 – Hollingshed	10 – Hollingshed	6 – Sherrod	CU Events Center (969); Boulder, CO
November 27, 2021*; 1:00 pm, Live Stream		Louisiana Tech; Rocky Mountain Hoops Classic	W 59–48	6–0	14 – Tuitele	7 – Miller	6 – Sherrod	CU Events Center (952); Boulder, CO
November 28, 2021*; 12:00 pm, P12N		Wisconsin; Rocky Mountain Hoops Classic	W 67–51	7–0	18 – Hollingshed	10 – Hollingshed	5 – Sherrod	CU Events Center (1,075); Boulder, CO
December 3, 2021*; 7:00 pm, Live Stream		Dixie State	W 78–53	8–0	20 – Miller	6 – Miller	3 – Tied	CU Events Center (956); Boulder, CO
December 7, 2021*; 6:30 pm, ESPN+	No. 25	at Southern Utah	W 81–47	9–0	18 – Miller	6 – Miller	4 – Tied	America First Event Center (537); Cedar, UT
December 17, 2021*; 6:00 pm, P12N		SMU	W 78–55	10–0	20 – Miller	7 – Hollingshed	5 – Tied	CU Events Center (1,195); Boulder, CO
December 20, 2021*; 1:00 pm, Live Stream		San Francisco	W 80–56	11–0	23 – Hollingshed	9 – Hollingshed	4 – Wetta	CU Events Center (1,132); Boulder, CO
January 2, 2022; 1:00 pm, P12N		at Oregon	Postponed due to COVID-19 protocols within the Colorado program. (Note: This game was postponed on December 29 due to COVID-19 protocols within the Buffaloes program.)					Matthew Knight Arena; Eugene, OR
January 7, 2022; 7:00 pm, P12N		USC	W 71–58	12–0 (1–0)	18 – Hollingshed	10 – Miller	8 – Sherrod	CU Events Center (1,592); Boulder, CO
January 9, 2022; 11:00 am, P12N		UCLA	W 71–63	13–0 (2–0)	25 – Sherrod	7 – Hollingshed	8 – Sherrod	CU Events Center (1,652); Boulder, CO
January 14, 2022; 7:00 pm, P12N	No. 22	No. 2 Stanford	L 52–60	13–1 (2–1)	16 – Miller	4 – Finau	3 – Wetta	CU Events Center (3,744); Boulder, CO
January 16, 2022; 12:00 pm, P12N	No. 22	California	Postponed due to COVID-19 protocols within the California program. (Note: This game was postponed on January 12 due to COVID-19 protocols within the Golden Bears program.)					CU Events Center; Boulder, CO
January 17, 2022 (Note: This game was originally scheduled on December 31 before being postponed and rescheduled to January 17 due to COVID-19 protocols within the Colorado program.); 3:00 pm, Live Stream	No. 22	at Oregon State	L 66–69 ^{OT}	13–2 (2–2)	18 – Miller	11 – Hollingshed	4 – Wetta	Gill Coliseum (3,854); Corvallis, OR
January 21, 2022; 5:00 pm, P12N	No. 22	at Arizona State	L 52–57 ^{OT}	13–3 (2–3)	12 – Miller	8 – Miller	5 – Wetta	Desert Financial Arena (2,190); Tempe, AZ
January 23, 2022; 12:00 pm, P12N	No. 22	at No. 10 Arizona	L 56–75	13–4 (2–4)	11 – Tied	10 – Hollingshed	3 – Tied	McKale Center (7,103); Tucson, AZ
January 28, 2022; 7:00 pm, P12N		at Utah	W 66–62 ^{OT}	14–4 (3–4)	16 – Tied	11 – Hollingshed	3 – Tied	Jon M. Huntsman Center (2,165); Salt Lake City, UT
January 30, 2022; 12:00 pm, P12N		Utah	L 67–78	14–5 (3–5)	28 – Hollingshed	7 – Hollingshed	5 – Tied	CU Events Center (1,921); Boulder, CO
February 4, 2022; 7:00 pm, P12N		Washington State	L 56–63	14–6 (3–6)	14 – Miller	5 – Hollingshed	3 – Wetta	CU Events Center (1,205); Boulder, CO
February 6, 2022; 12:00 pm, P12N		Washington	W 66–43	15–6 (4–6)	20 – Hollingshed	6 – Tied	4 – Hollingshed	CU Events Center (2,111); Boulder, CO
February 11, 2022; 8:00 pm, P12N		at California	W 73–56	16–6 (5–6)	15 – Tuitele	7 – Hollingshed	7 – Sherrod	Haas Pavilion (2,194); Berkeley, CA
February 13, 2022; 1:00 pm, P12N		at No. 2 Stanford	L 46–63	16–7 (5–7)	11 – Finau	10 – Hollingshed	4 – Sherrod	Maples Pavilion (3,038); Stanford, CA
February 18, 2022; 8:00 pm, P12N		at UCLA	W 67–54	17–7 (6–7)	19 – Hollingshed	7 – Tied	4 – Tied	Pauley Pavilion (2,204); Los Angeles, CA
February 20, 2022; 2:00 pm, P12N		at USC	W 67–54	18–7 (7–7)	16 – Hollingshed	6 – Hollingshed	3 – Tied	Galen Center (836); Los Angeles, CA
February 23, 2022; 7:00 pm, P12N		No. 25 Oregon	W 86–83 ^{2OT}	19–7 (8–7)	17 – Sherrod	10 – Hollingshed	8 – Sherrod	CU Events Center (1,796); Boulder, CO
February 26, 2022; 12:00 pm, P12N		Oregon State	W 60–45	20–7 (9–7)	15 – Formann	8 – Hollingshed	5 – Sherrod	CU Events Center (2,042); Boulder, CO
Pac-12 Women's Tournament
March 2, 2022; 1:00 pm, P12N	(5)	vs. (12) Washington; First Round	W 64–52	21–7	16 – Tuitele	12 – Hollingshed	4 – Hollingshed	Michelob Ultra Arena (3,044); Paradise, NV
March 3, 2022; 1:00 pm, P12N	(5)	vs. (4) No. 14 Arizona; Quarterfinals	W 45–43	22–7	12 – Hollingshed	9 – Hollingshed	4 – Wetta	Michelob Ultra Arena (4,122); Paradise, NV
March 4, 2022; 7:00 pm, P12N	(5)	vs. (1) No. 2 Stanford; Semifinals	L 45–71	22–8	12 – Wetta	10 – Hollingshed	2 – Tied	Michelob Ultra Arena (4,917); Paradise, NV
NCAA tournament
March 18, 2022*; 11:30 am, ESPNews	(7 G)	vs. (10 G) Creighton; First Round	L 74–84	22–9	27 – Sherrod	9 – Tuitele	5 – Sherrod	Carver–Hawkeye Arena (14,382); Iowa City, IA
*Non-conference game. ^{#}Rankings from AP Poll. (#) Tournament seedings in parentheses. G=Greensboro. All times are in Mountain Time.

== Rankings ==
Ranking movements Legend: ██ Increase in ranking ██ Decrease in ranking — = Not ranked RV = Received votes
	Week																				
Poll	Pre	1	2	3	4	5	6	7	8	9	10	11	12	13	14	15	16	17	18	19	Final
AP	—	—*	RV	RV	RV	25	RV	RV	RV	RV	22	22	—	—	—	—	—	RV	RV	RV	Not released
Coaches	RV	RV*	RV^	RV	RV	RV	RV	RV	RV	RV	22	23	RV	—	—	—	—	RV	RV	RV	

*The preseason and week 1 polls were the same.
^Coaches did not release a week 2 poll.
