= 2021–22 California Golden Bears women's basketball team =

Intercollegiate basketball season

2021–22 California Golden Bears women's basketball
- Conference: Pac-12 Conference
- Record: 11–13 (2–10 Pac-12)
- Head coach: Charmin Smith (3rd season)
- Assistant coaches: Kelly Cole; Paul Reed; Eliza Pierre
- Home arena: Haas Pavilion

2021–22 Pac-12 Conference women's basketball standings
	Conf.				Overall
Team	W		L	PCT	W		L	PCT
No. 2 Stanford †	16	–	0	1.000	32	–	4	.889
Oregon	11	–	6	.647	20	–	12	.625
Washington State	11	–	6	.647	19	–	11	.633
No. 19 Arizona	10	–	6	.625	21	–	8	.724
Colorado	9	–	7	.563	22	–	9	.710
Utah	8	–	7	.533	21	–	12	.636
UCLA	8	–	8	.500	18	–	13	.581
Oregon State	6	–	9	.400	17	–	14	.548
Arizona State	4	–	9	.308	12	–	14	.462
USC	5	–	12	.294	12	–	16	.429
California	2	–	10	.167	11	–	13	.458
Washington	2	–	12	.143	7	–	16	.304
† 2022 Pac-12 Tournament winner Rankings from AP poll

The 2021–22 California Golden Bears women's basketball team represented the University of California, Berkeley during the 2021–22 NCAA Division I women's basketball season. The Golden Bears, led by third year head coach Charmin Smith, played their home games at Haas Pavilion and competed as members of the Pac-12 Conference.

== Previous season ==
The Golden Bears finished the season 1–16, 1–12 in Pac-12 play to finish in last place. They lost in the first round of the Pac-12 women's tournament to Oregon State. The Golden Bears did not receive a bid in either the NCAA Tournament or the WNIT.

== Roster ==
2021–22 California Golden Bears women's basketball team
Players
Coaches

Pos.	#	Name	Height	Year	Previous school	Hometown
F	0	Michelle Onyiah	6 ft 3 in (1.91 m)	So	Eleanor Roosevelt	Eastvale, CA
G	1	Leilani McIntosh	5 ft 5 in (1.65 m)	Jr	Xavier College Prep	Phoenix, AZ
G/F	3	Dalayah Daniels	6 ft 3 in (1.91 m)	So	Garfield	Seattle, WA
G	4	Karisma Ortiz	6 ft 0 in (1.83 m)	GS	Archbishop Mitty; Penn State; Texas	San Jose, CA
G	10	Jazlen Green	5 ft 11 in (1.8 m)	Jr	Lakeside	Upland, CA
F	12	Jadyn Bush	5 ft 11 in (1.8 m)	GS	Bishop Blanchet; Harvard	Federal Way, WA
G	14	Alma Elsnitz	5 ft 11 in (1.8 m)	So	Lulea Basketgymnasium	Stockholm, Sweden
G	21	Mia Mastrov	5 ft 11 in (1.8 m)	Fr	Miramonte	Lafayette, CA
G	22	Cailyn Crocker	5 ft 9 in (1.75 m)	Jr	Mater Dei	Cypress, CA
F	24	Evelien Lutje Schipholt	6 ft 2 in (1.88 m)	Jr	Caland Lyceum	The Hague, The Netherlands
G	30	Jayda Curry	5 ft 6 in (1.68 m)	Fr	Centennial	Corona, CA
G	31	Ornela Muca	5 ft 7 in (1.7 m)	So	American Community School of Athens	Athens, Greece
C	32	Sela Heide	6 ft 7 in (2.01 m)	So	Mount Si	North Bend, WA
C	33	Fatou Samb	6 ft 4 in (1.93 m)	So	Westside	Houston, TX
G	34	Sierra Richey	5 ft 10 in (1.78 m)	GS	Rancho Campana	Camarillo, CA

Head coach

- Charmin Smith (Stanford)

Assistant coach(es)

- Kelly Cole (Northwestern)
- Paul Reed (Langston)
- Eliza Pierre (California)

Legend

- (C) Team captain
- (S) Suspended
- (I) Ineligible
- (W) Walk-on
- Injured
- Current redshirt

Roster
Last update: February 13, 2022

== Schedule ==
Date time, TV	Rank^{#}	Opponent^{#}	Result	Record	High points	High rebounds	High assists	Site (attendance) city, state
Exhibition
October 28, 2021*; 7:00 pm, Live Stream		Westmont	W 81–62	–	23 – Curry	16 – Lutje Schipholt	7 – McIntosh	Haas Pavilion (436); Berkeley, CA
November 4, 2021*; 7:00 pm, Live Stream		Saint Martin's	W 79–32	–	20 – Curry	10 – Daniels	3 – Curry	Haas Pavilion (418); Berkeley, CA
Regular Season
November 9, 2021*; 7:00 pm, Live Stream		Sacramento State	W 90–71	1–0	23 – Curry	11 – Lutje Schipholt	5 – McIntosh	Haas Pavilion (1,591); Berkeley, CA
November 13, 2021*; 2:30 pm, WCC Network		vs. San Francisco	W 70–41	2–0	27 – Curry	10 – Bush	4 – McIntosh	Chase Center (2,057); San Francisco, CA
November 16, 2021*; 7:00 pm, Live Stream		Utah State	W 81–49	3–0	23 – Lutje Schipholt	17 – Lutje Schipholt	6 – Crocker	Haas Pavilion (1,364); Berkeley, CA
November 20, 2021*; 4:00 pm, ESPN+		at UC San Diego	W 64–54	4–0	20 – Curry	13 – Lutje Schipholt	7 – Curry	RIMAC Arena (714); San Diego, CA
November 26, 2021*; 1:00 pm, Live Stream		Furman; Raising the BAR Invitational	W 82–73	5–0	26 – Curry	14 – Lutje Schipholt	6 – Tied	Haas Pavilion (1,422); Berkeley, CA
November 27, 2021*; 3:00 pm, Live Stream		Ole Miss; Raising the BAR Invitational	L 45–64	5–1	12 – Curry	8 – Lutje Schipholt	3 – McIntosh	Haas Pavilion (1,382); Berkeley, CA
December 2, 2021*; 11:30 am, Live Stream		Fresno State	W 73–72	6–1	15 – Tied	11 – Bush	4 – Tied	Haas Pavilion (1,055); Berkeley, CA
December 5, 2021*; 11:00 am, SECN+		at Arkansas	L 67–84	6–2	18 – Curry	8 – Lutje Schipholt	5 – Crocker	Bud Walton Arena (3,100); Fayetteville, AR
December 11, 2021*; 2:00 pm, Live Stream		McNeese State	W 102–60	7–2	17 – Tied	10 – Onyiah	9 – McIntosh	Haas Pavilion (1,305); Berkeley, CA
December 18, 2021*; 3:00 pm, Live Stream		Cal Poly	W 89–73	8–2	27 – Curry	9 – Daniels	5 – Daniels	Haas Pavilion (1,499); Berkeley, CA
December 21, 2021*; 1:00 pm, Live Stream		Saint Mary's	W 73–55	9–2	20 – Lutje Schipholt	10 – Lutje Schipholt	6 – McIntosh	Haas Pavilion (1,334); Berkeley, CA
December 31, 2021; 7:00 pm, P12N		at Washington State	L 42–69	9–3 (0–1)	11 – Crocker	8 – Tied	3 – McIntosh	Beasley Coliseum (627); Pullman, WA
January 2, 2022; 12:00 pm, P12N		at Washington	Postponed due to COVID-19 protocols within the Washington program. (Note: This game was postponed on December 27 due to COVID-19 protocols within the Huskies program.)					Alaska Airlines Arena; Seattle, WA
January 7, 2022; 7:00 pm, P12N		Oregon State	Postponed due to COVID-19 protocols within the Oregon State program. (Note: This game was postponed on January 5 due to COVID-19 protocols within the Beavers program.)					Haas Pavilion; Berkeley, CA
January 9, 2022; 1:00 pm, P12N		Oregon	L 53–88	9–4 (0–2)	13 – Curry	8 – Lutje Schipholt	4 – McIntosh	Haas Pavilion (1,595); Berkeley, CA
January 13, 2022; 6:00 pm, P12N		at Utah	Postponed due to COVID-19 protocols within the California program. (Note: This game was postponed on January 12 due to COVID-19 protocols within the Golden Bears program.)					Jon M. Huntsman Center; Salt Lake City, UT
January 16, 2022; 11:00 am, P12N		at Colorado	Postponed due to COVID-19 protocols within the California program. (Note: This game was postponed on January 12 due to COVID-19 protocols within the Golden Bears program.)					CU Events Center; Boulder, CO
January 21, 2022; 7:00 pm, P12N		at No. 2 Stanford	L 74–97	9–5 (0–3)	30 – Curry	5 – Samb	3 – Tied	Maples Pavilion (0); Stanford, CA
January 23, 2022; 4:00 pm, P12N		No. 2 Stanford	Postponed due to COVID-19 protocols within the California program. (Note: This game was postponed on January 22 due to COVID-19 protocols within the Golden Bears program.)					Haas Pavilion; Berkeley, CA
January 28, 2022; 7:00 pm, P12N		No. 8 Arizona	Postponed due to COVID-19 protocols within the California program. (Note: This game was postponed on January 24 due to COVID-19 protocols within the Golden Bears program.)					Haas Pavilion; Berkeley, CA
February 4, 2022; 7:00 pm, P12N		at USC	W 62–59	10–5 (1–3)	21 – Curry	8 – Lutje Schipholt	3 – Tied	Galen Center (2,098); Los Angeles, CA
February 6, 2022; 12:00 pm, P12N		at UCLA	L 54–59	10–6 (1–4)	17 – Green	6 – Tied	5 – McIntosh	Pauley Pavilion (1,620); Los Angeles, CA
February 11, 2022; 7:00 pm, P12N		Colorado	L 56–73	10–7 (1–5)	16 – Curry	7 – Lutje Schipholt	5 – McIntosh	Haas Pavilion (2,194); Berkeley, CA
February 13, 2022; 1:00 pm, P12N		Utah	L 75–80 ^{OT}	10–8 (1–6)	17 – Daniels	8 – Lutje Schipholt	6 – McIntosh	Haas Pavilion (1,066); Berkeley, CA
February 16, 2022 (Note: This game was added on February 15 due to the originally scheduled game against Arizona State getting canceled.)*; 1:00 pm, Live Stream		Cal State LA	W 98–53	11–8	20 – Green	12 – Onyiah	6 – McIntosh	Haas Pavilion (1,001); Berkeley, CA
February 16, 2022; 1:00 pm, P12N		Arizona State	Forfeiture by Arizona State due to an aircraft malfunction. (Note: This game was originally scheduled on January 30 before being postponed and rescheduled to February 16 due to COVID-19 protocols within the California program. It was ruled a win for California in the conference standings on February 16 due to an aircraft malfunction.)					Haas Pavilion; Berkeley, CA
February 18, 2022; 7:00 pm, P12N		at Oregon	L 47–52	11–9 (2–7)	10 – Daniels	9 – Lutje Schipholt	7 – McIntosh	Matthew Knight Arena (7,968); Eugene, OR
February 20, 2022; 12:00 pm, P12N		at Oregon State	L 59–68	11–10 (2–8)	23 – Curry	8 – McIntosh	3 – Curry	Gill Coliseum (4,401); Corvallis, OR
February 24, 2022; 7:00 pm, P12N		Washington	L 60–61	11–11 (2–9)	21 – Daniels	7 – Daniels	2 – Tied	Haas Pavilion (1,609); Berkeley, CA
February 26, 2022; 12:00 pm, P12N		Washington State	L 67–73	11–12 (2–10)	19 – Curry	6 – Oniyah	3 – Tied	Haas Pavilion (1,390); Berkeley, CA
Pac-12 Women's Tournament
March 2, 2022; 8:30 pm, P12N	(11)	vs. (6) Utah; First Round	L 60–66	11–13	16 – Curry	7 – Tied	3 – Tied	Michelob Ultra Arena (3,010); Paradise, NV
*Non-conference game. ^{#}Rankings from AP Poll. (#) Tournament seedings in parentheses. All times are in Pacific Time.

== Rankings ==
Ranking movements Legend: — = Not ranked
	Week																				
Poll	Pre	1	2	3	4	5	6	7	8	9	10	11	12	13	14	15	16	17	18	19	Final
AP	—	—*	—	—	—	—	—	—	—	—	—	—	—	—	—	—	—	—	—	—	Not released
Coaches	—	—*	—^	—	—	—	—	—	—	—	—	—	—	—	—	—	—	—	—	—	

*The preseason and week 1 polls were the same.
^Coaches did not release a week 2 poll.

== See also ==
2021–22 California Golden Bears men's basketball team
