= 2021–22 Oregon Ducks women's basketball team =

Intercollegiate basketball season

2021–22 Oregon Ducks women's basketball

NCAA tournament, first round
- Conference: Pac-12 Conference
- Record: 20–12 (11–6 Pac-12)
- Head coach: Kelly Graves (8th season)
- Associate head coach: Jodie Berry
- Assistant coaches: Jackie Nared Hairston; Mike Moser
- Home arena: Matthew Knight Arena

2021–22 Pac-12 Conference women's basketball standings
	Conf.				Overall
Team	W		L	PCT	W		L	PCT
No. 2 Stanford †	16	–	0	1.000	32	–	4	.889
Oregon	11	–	6	.647	20	–	12	.625
Washington State	11	–	6	.647	19	–	11	.633
No. 19 Arizona	10	–	6	.625	21	–	8	.724
Colorado	9	–	7	.563	22	–	9	.710
Utah	8	–	7	.533	21	–	12	.636
UCLA	8	–	8	.500	18	–	13	.581
Oregon State	6	–	9	.400	17	–	14	.548
Arizona State	4	–	9	.308	12	–	14	.462
USC	5	–	12	.294	12	–	16	.429
California	2	–	10	.167	11	–	13	.458
Washington	2	–	12	.143	7	–	16	.304
† 2022 Pac-12 Tournament winner Rankings from AP poll

The 2021–22 Oregon Ducks women's basketball team represented the University of Oregon during the 2021–22 NCAA Division I women's basketball season. The Ducks were led by eighth-year head coach Kelly Graves, and they played their home games at Matthew Knight Arena as members of the Pac-12 Conference.

== Previous season ==
The Ducks finished the season at 15–9 and 10–7 in Pac-12 play to finish in fourth place. They received a bye in the Pac-12 Tournament and lost in their first game to their rivals, Oregon State. The Ducks received a bid to the NCAA tournament. They defeated South Dakota and Georgia in the first and second rounds before losing to Louisville in the Sweet Sixteen.

== Offseason ==
=== Departures ===
Due to COVID-19 disruptions throughout NCAA sports in 2020–21, the NCAA announced that the 2020–21 season would not count against the athletic eligibility of any individual involved in an NCAA winter sport, including women's basketball. This meant that all seniors in 2020–21 had the option to return for 2021–22.

Name	Number	Pos.	Height	Year	Hometown	Reason left
Taylor Chavez	3	Guard	5'10"	Junior	Surprise, AZ	Transferred to Arizona
Jaz Shelley	4	Guard	5'9"	Sophomore	Moe, VIC, Australia	Transferred to Nebraska
Arielle Wilson	10	Forward	6'6"	Junior	Fayetteville, NC	Retired
Taylor Mikesell	11	Guard	5'11"	Junior	Massillon, OH	Transferred to Ohio State
Lydia Giomi	14	Forward	6'6"	Senior	Seattle, WA	Graduated; chose not to return
Erin Boley	21	Forward	6'2"	Senior	Hodgenville, KY	Graduated; chose not to return
Angela Dugalić	25	Forward	6'4"	Freshman	Des Plaines, IL	Transferred to UCLA

=== Incoming transfers ===
Name	Number	Pos.	Height	Year	Hometown	Date eligible	Years eligible	Previous school
Ahlise Hurst	0	Guard	5'9"	Senior	Bendigo, Australia	May 14, 2021	2	New Mexico
Endyia Rogers	4	Guard	5'7"	Junior	Dallas, TX	June 27, 2021	3	USC
Shannon Dufficy	5	Forward	6'2"	Senior	Melbourne, Australia	June 18, 2021	2	Utah State
Chanaya Pinto	10	Forward	6'1"	Junior	Maputo, Mozambique	May 25, 2021	3	Northwest Florida State College
Taylor Hosendove	11	Forward	6'1"	Senior	Atlanta, GA	May 12, 2021	2	Georgia State

== Roster ==
2021–22 Oregon Ducks women's basketball team
Players
Coaches

Pos.	#	Name	Height	Year	Previous school	Hometown
G	0	Ahlise Hurst	5 ft 9 in (1.75 m)	Sr	Bendigo Sr. Secondary; New Mexico	Bendigo, Australia
F	1	Nyara Sabally	6 ft 5 in (1.96 m)	RS Jr	Rotteck Gymnasium	Berlin, Germany
G	3	Taylor Bigby	6 ft 1 in (1.85 m)	Fr	Centennial HS	Las Vegas, NV
G	4	Endyia Rogers	5 ft 7 in (1.7 m)	Jr	Bishop Lynch HS; USC	Dallas, TX
F	5	Shannon Dufficy	6 ft 2 in (1.88 m)	Sr	Our Lady of Mercy; Utah State; Missouri	Melbourne, Australia
F	10	Chanaya Pinto	6 ft 1 in (1.85 m)	Jr	Carçavelos; NW Florida College	Maputo, Mozambique
F	11	Taylor Hosendove	6 ft 2 in (1.88 m)	Sr	Westlake HS; Clemson; Georgia State	Atlanta, GA
F	12	Te-Hina Paopao	5 ft 9 in (1.75 m)	So	La Jolla Country Day	Oceanside, CA
C	15	Phillipina Kyei	6 ft 8 in (2.03 m)	Fr	Crestwood Prep	Calgary, AB
F	22	Kylee Watson	6 ft 4 in (1.93 m)	So	Mainland	Linwood, NJ
G	23	Maddie Scherr	5 ft 11 in (1.8 m)	So	Ryle	Florence, KY
F	32	Sedona Prince	6 ft 7 in (2.01 m)	RS Jr	Liberty Hill HS; Texas	Liberty Hill, TX
G	33	Sydney Parrish	6 ft 2 in (1.88 m)	So	Hamilton Southeastern	Fishers, IN

Head coach

- Kelly Graves (New Mexico)

Assistant coach(es)

- Jodie Berry (Western Washington)
- Jackie Nared Hairston (Saint Mary's)
- Mike Moser (UNLV)

Legend

- (C) Team captain
- (S) Suspended
- (I) Ineligible
- (W) Walk-on
- Injured
- Current redshirt

Roster
Last update: January 19, 2022

== Schedule ==
Date time, TV	Rank^{#}	Opponent^{#}	Result	Record	High points	High rebounds	High assists	Site (attendance) city, state
Exhibition
October 28, 2021*; 6:00 pm, live stream	No. 10	Saint Martin's	W 93–26	–	22 – Paopao	7 – Tied	7 – Scherr	Matthew Knight Arena (7,475); Eugene, OR
November 6, 2021*; 12:00 pm, live stream	No. 10	Westmont	W 95–65	–	18 – Kyei	11 – Tied	8 – Scherr	Matthew Knight Arena (7,323); Eugene, OR
Regular Season
November 9, 2021*; 7:30 pm, live stream	No. 10	Idaho State	W 91–34	1–0	18 – Prince	10 – Kyei	5 – Scherr	Matthew Knight Arena (7,436); Eugene, OR
November 14, 2021*; 5:00 pm, live stream	No. 10	Dixie State	W 84–35	2–0	17 – Hurst	10 – Kyei	5 – Tied	Matthew Knight Arena (8,761); Eugene, OR
November 20, 2021*; 2:00 pm, FloHoops	No. 9	vs. Oklahoma; Battle 4 Atlantis quarterfinal	W 98–93	3–0	30 – Sabally	11 – Tied	4 – Tied	Imperial Arena (875); Nassau, Bahamas
November 21, 2021*; 11:30 am, FloHoops	No. 9	vs. No. 1 South Carolina; Battle 4 Atlantis semifinal	L 63–80	3–1	12 – Tied	6 – Kyei	5 – Scherr	Imperial Arena (545); Nassau, Bahamas
November 22, 2021*; 11:30 am, ESPNU	No. 9	vs. No. 23 South Florida; Battle 4 Atlantis third place game	L 62–71	3–2	15 – Tied	7 – Tied	3 – Tied	Imperial Arena (269); Nassau, Bahamas
December 1, 2021*; 3:30 pm, P12N	No. 18	UC Davis	L 57–64	3–3	11 – Tied	7 – Kyei	3 – Tied	Matthew Knight Arena (7,090); Eugene, OR
December 4, 2021*; 6:00 pm, None	No. 18	Portland	W 62–59	4–3	26 – Parrish	8 – Prince	6 – Scherr	Chiles Center (2,162); Portland, OR
December 11, 2021*; 2:00 pm, live stream		Long Beach State	W 68–59	5–3	19 – Hurst	8 – Prince	9 – Scherr	Matthew Knight Arena (7,431); Eugene, OR
December 13, 2021*; 6:00 pm, live stream		McNeese State	W 109–38	6–3	21 – Tied	13 – Kyei	8 – Scherr	Matthew Knight Arena (7,011); Eugene, OR
December 18, 2021*; 4:30 pm, ESPN+		at Kansas State	L 56–68	6–4	16 – Scherr	6 – Watson	6 – Scherr	Bramlage Coliseum (5,209); Manhattan, KS
December 21, 2021*; 6:00 pm, BTN		at Northwestern	Canceled due to COVID-19 protocols within the Northwestern program. (Note: This game was canceled on December 21 due to COVID-19 protocols within the Wildcats program. This game was declared a no contest by the NCAA.)					Welsh-Ryan Arena; Evanston, IL
January 2, 2022; 12:00 pm, P12N		Colorado	Postponed due to COVID-19 protocols within the Colorado program. (Note: This game was postponed on December 29 due to COVID-19 protocols within the Buffaloes program.)					Matthew Knight Arena; Eugene, OR
January 2, 2022*; 12:00 pm, live stream		Carroll (MT)	W 88–57	7–4	15 – Sabally	5 – Scherr	3 – Tied	Matthew Knight Arena (6,945); Eugene, OR
January 7, 2022; 7:00 pm, P12N		at No. 2 Stanford	L 68–80	7–5 (0–1)	22 – Rogers	8 – Sabally	2 – Rogers	Maples Pavilion (0); Stanford, CA
January 9, 2022; 1:00 pm, P12N		at California	W 88–53	8–5 (1–1)	21 – Tied	9 – Sabally	5 – Sabally	Haas Pavilion (1,595); Berkeley, CA
January 15, 2022; 2:30 pm, P12N		No. 7 Arizona	W 68–66 ^{OT}	9–5 (2–1)	24 – Paopao	13 – Sabally	3 – Paopao	Matthew Knight Arena (7,944); Eugene, OR
January 17, 2022*; 2:00 pm, ESPN2		No. 9 UConn	W 72–59	10–5	22 – Paopao	8 – Paopao	6 – Rogers	Matthew Knight Arena (9,439); Eugene, OR
January 21, 2022; 7:00 pm, P12N		at Washington	W 68–61	11–5 (3–1)	23 – Rogers	7 – Tied	4 – Tied	Alaska Airlines Arena (1,832); Seattle, WA
January 26, 2022 (Note: This game was originally scheduled on December 31 before being postponed and rescheduled to January 26 due to COVID-19 protocols within the Utah program.); 11:00 am, P12N	No. 19	Utah	W 70–66	12–5 (4–1)	15 – Sabally	5 – Tied	5 – Paopao	Matthew Knight Arena (7,075); Eugene, OR
January 28, 2022; 8:00 pm, P12N	No. 19	UCLA	Forfeited to Oregon due to excess non-COVID injuries within the UCLA program.					Matthew Knight Arena; Eugene, OR
January 30, 2022; 12:00 pm, P12N	No. 19	USC	W 80–48	13–5 (6–1)	23 – Sabally	7 – Tied	4 – Rogers	Matthew Knight Arena (7,613); Eugene, OR
February 1, 2022 (Note: This game was originally scheduled on January 13 before being postponed and rescheduled to February 1 due to COVID-19 protocols within the Arizona State program.); 2:00 pm, live stream	No. 19	Arizona State	W 72–58	14–5 (7–1)	22 – Sabally	6 – Tied	6 – Paopao	Matthew Knight Arena (6,950); Eugene, OR
February 4, 2022; 7:00 pm, P12N	No. 19	at No. 8 Arizona	L 48–63	14–6 (7–2)	17 – Rogers	7 – Rogers	1 – Tied	McKale Center (10,413); Tucson, AZ
February 6, 2022; 1:00 pm, P12N	No. 19	at Arizona State	L 49–55	14–7 (7–3)	18 – Rogers	10 – Sabally	5 – Paopao	Desert Financial Arena (2,912); Tempe, AZ
February 9, 2022 (Note: This game was originally scheduled on January 23 before being postponed and rescheduled to February 9 due to COVID-19 protocols within the Washington State program.); 12:00 pm, P12N	No. 24	at Washington State	W 83–30	15–7 (8–3)	17 – Rogers	8 – Tied	8 – Scherr	Beasley Coliseum (760); Pullman, WA
February 11, 2022; 8:00 pm, P12N	No. 24	at Oregon State; Rivalry	W 74–66	16–7 (9–3)	22 – Paopao	12 – Sabally	6 – Rogers	Gill Coliseum (6,097); Corvallis, OR
February 13, 2022; 1:00 pm, P12N	No. 24	Oregon State	L 62–68	16–8 (9–4)	17 – Paopao	5 – Parrish	4 – Rogers	Matthew Knight Arena (8,404); Eugene, OR
February 16, 2022 (Note: This game was added on February 8 to make up for the forfeiture earlier this season. This game will only count against the overall record.)*; 4:00 pm, P12N		UCLA	W 67–53	17–8	16 – Rogers	10 – Sabally	4 – Tied	Matthew Knight Arena (7,223); Eugene, OR
February 18, 2022; 7:00 pm, P12N		California	W 52–47	18–8 (10–4)	15 – Prince	8 – Tied	4 – Paopao	Matthew Knight Arena (7,968); Eugene, OR
February 20, 2022; 1:00 pm, ESPN2		No. 2 Stanford	L 62–66	18–9 (10–5)	23 – Paopao	7 – Sabally	5 – Paopao	Matthew Knight Arena (8,981); Eugene, OR
February 23, 2022; 6:00 pm, P12N	No. 25	at Colorado	L 83–86 ^{2OT}	18–10 (10–6)	28 – Rogers	11 – Sabally	6 – Paopao	CU Events Center (1,796); Boulder, CO
February 26, 2022; 12:00 pm, P12N	No. 25	at Utah	W 73–65	19–10 (11–6)	18 – Parrish	8 – Paopao	5 – Paopao	Jon M. Huntsman Center (2,207); Salt Lake City, UT
Pac-12 Women's Tournament
March 3, 2022; 6:00 pm, P12N	(2)	vs. (7) UCLA; Quarterfinals	W 63–60	20–10	16 – Rogers	15 – Sabally	6 – Rogers	Michelob Ultra Arena (4,428); Paradise, NV
March 4, 2022; 8:30 pm, P12N	(2)	vs. (6) Utah; Semifinals	L 73–80	20–11	17 – Paopao	12 – Sabally	4 – Paopao	Michelob Ultra Arena (4,917); Paradise, NV
NCAA tournament
March 19, 2022; 2:30 pm, ESPN2	(5 W)	vs. (12 W) Belmont; First Round	L 70–73 ^{2OT}	20–12	31 – Sabally	12 – Sabally	5 – Rogers	Thompson–Boling Arena (5,448); Knoxville, TN
*Non-conference game. ^{#}Rankings from AP Poll. (#) Tournament seedings in parentheses. W=Wichita. All times are in Pacific Time.

== Rankings ==
Ranking movements Legend: ██ Increase in ranking ██ Decrease in ranking — = Not ranked RV = Received votes т = Tied with team above or below
	Week																				
Poll	Pre	1	2	3	4	5	6	7	8	9	10	11	12	13	14	15	16	17	18	19	Final
AP	10	10*	9	15	18т	RV	RV	—	—	—	—	RV	19	19	24	RV	25т	RV			Not released
Coaches	9	9*	9^	13	16	22	23	—	—	—	—	RV	25	22	25т	RV	RV	RV			RV

*The preseason and week 1 polls were the same.
^Coaches did not release a week 2 poll.

== See also ==
- 2021–22 Oregon Ducks men's basketball team
