= 2021–22 Washington State Cougars women's basketball team =

Intercollegiate basketball season

2021–22 Washington State Cougars women's basketball

NCAA tournament, first round
- Conference: Pac-12 Conference
- Record: 19–11 (11–6 Pac-12)
- Head coach: Kamie Ethridge (4th season)
- Assistant coaches: Laurie Koehn; Jason Chainey; Camille Williams
- Home arena: Beasley Coliseum

2021–22 Pac-12 Conference women's basketball standings
	Conf.				Overall
Team	W		L	PCT	W		L	PCT
No. 2 Stanford †	16	–	0	1.000	32	–	4	.889
Oregon	11	–	6	.647	20	–	12	.625
Washington State	11	–	6	.647	19	–	11	.633
No. 19 Arizona	10	–	6	.625	21	–	8	.724
Colorado	9	–	7	.563	22	–	9	.710
Utah	8	–	7	.533	21	–	12	.636
UCLA	8	–	8	.500	18	–	13	.581
Oregon State	6	–	9	.400	17	–	14	.548
Arizona State	4	–	9	.308	12	–	14	.462
USC	5	–	12	.294	12	–	16	.429
California	2	–	10	.167	11	–	13	.458
Washington	2	–	12	.143	7	–	16	.304
† 2022 Pac-12 Tournament winner Rankings from AP poll

The 2021–22 Washington State Cougars women's basketball team represented Washington State University during the 2021–22 NCAA Division I women's basketball season. The Cougars were led by fourth-year head coach Kamie Ethridge, and played their home games at Beasley Coliseum as members of the Pac-12 Conference.

== Previous season ==
In the previous season, the Cougars finished with an overall record of 12–12. They finished conference play with a 9–10 record. As the #7 seed in the tournament, the Cougars defeated the #10 seed Utah Utes in the first round, but lost to the #2 seed Arizona Wildcats in the quarterfinals. The Cougars received an at-large bid to the 2021 NCAA Division I women's basketball tournament. They received the #9 seed in the Mercado Regional. They lost in the first round to the #8 seed South Florida and were eliminated.

== Roster ==
2021–22 Washington State Cougars women's basketball team
Players
Coaches

Pos.	#	Name	Height	Year	Previous school	Hometown
G	2	Michaela Jones	5 ft 10 in (1.78 m)	RS Jr	Beatrice	Wymore, NE
G	3	Emma Nankervis	6 ft 3 in (1.91 m)	So	N/A	Mount, Eliza, Australia
G	4	Krystal Leger-Walker	5 ft 9 in (1.75 m)	RS Sr	N/A	Waikato, New Zealand
G	5	Charlisse Leger-Walker	5 ft 10 in (1.78 m)	So	St. Peter's School	Waikato, New Zealand
G	10	Ekin Celikdemir	5 ft 10 in (1.78 m)	Fr	Tilton	Istanbul, Turkey
F	13	Shir Levy	5 ft 11 in (1.8 m)	Jr	Gymnasia Realit	Ness Ziona, Israel
C	14	Jessica Clarke	6 ft 3 in (1.91 m)	Fr	St. Thomas Aquinas	North Vancouver, Canada
F	15	Ula Motuga	6 ft 0 in (1.83 m)	Jr	Caterbury College	Logan, Australia
G	20	Grace Sarver	5 ft 8 in (1.73 m)	So	West Seattle	Seattle, WA
G	21	Johanna Teder	5 ft 8 in (1.73 m)	So	South Plains College	Tartu, Estonia
G	22	Celena Molina	5 ft 9 in (1.75 m)	RS Jr	Konawaena	Kailua, HI
C	55	Bella Murekatete	6 ft 5 in (1.96 m)	Jr	Genesis Prep Academy	Ngoma Huye, Nigeria

Head coach

- Kamie Ethridge (Texas)

Assistant coach(es)

- Laurie Koehn (Kansas State)
- Jason Chainey (Yeronga institute of TAFE)
- Camille Williams (Wisconsin)

Legend

- (C) Team captain
- (S) Suspended
- (I) Ineligible
- (W) Walk-on
- Injured
- Current redshirt

Roster
Last update: February 20, 2022

== Schedule ==
Date time, TV	Rank^{#}	Opponent^{#}	Result	Record	High points	High rebounds	High assists	Site (attendance) city, state
Exhibition
October 24, 2021*; 2:00 pm		Saint Martins	W 89–38		17 – Motuga	7 – Motuga	11 – K. Leger-Walker	Beasley Coliseum (436); Pullman, WA
November 5, 2021*; 7:00 pm		Northwest Nazarene	W 113–46		20 – Teder	11 – Murekatete	8 – K. Leger-Walker	Beasley Coliseum (295); Pullman, WA
Regular Season
November 9, 2021*; 7:00 pm, Live Stream		San Jose State	W 86–56	1–0	22 – Tied	9 – Tied	8 – K. Leger-Walker	Beasley Coliseum (713); Pullman, WA
November 12, 2021*; 2:00 pm, Live Stream		Northern Arizona	W 62–54	2–0	22 – C. Leger-Walker	15 – Murekatete	3 – Tied	Beasley Coliseum (934); Pullman, WA
November 21, 2021*; 2:00 pm, ESPN+		at Idaho; Battle of the Palouse	W 73–59	3–0	13 – Teder	10 – Murekatete	6 – K. Leger-Walker	ICCU Arena (1,074); Moscow, ID
November 25, 2021*; 1:00 pm, FloSports		vs. Miami (FL); Baha Mar Hoops	W 62–47	4–0	15 – Teder	14 – C. Leger-Walker	5 – C. Leger-Walker	Kendal Isaacs National Gymnasium; Nassau, Bahamas
November 27, 2021*; 3:00 pm, FloSports		vs. No. 5 NC State; Baha Mar Hoops	L 34–62	4–1	7 – Wallack	8 – Murekatete	4 – K. Leger-Walker	Kendal Isaacs National Gymnasium; Nassau, Bahamas
December 2, 2021*; 12:00 pm, Live Stream		San Francisco	W 72–58	5–1	27 – C. Leger-Walker	9 – Motuga	5 – K. Leger-Walker	Beasley Coliseum (785); Pullman, WA
December 4, 2021*; 4:30 pm, ESPN+		at UC Davis	W 71–49	6–1	14 – Murekatete	8 – Murekatete	5 – K. Leger-Walker	University Credit Union Center (1,192); Davis, CA
December 8, 2021*; 6:00 pm, SWX		at Gonzaga	W 51–49	7–1	14 – C. Leger-Walker	10 – Murekatete	3 – Tied	McCarthey Athletic Center (3,469); Spokane, WA
December 12, 2021*; 12:00 pm, P12N		Boise State	W 62–55	8–1	23 – C. Leger-Walker	8 – Murekatete	6 – K. Leger-Walker	Beasley Coliseum (715); Pullman, WA
December 18, 2021*; 11:00 am, BYU TV		at No. 20 BYU	L 53–71	8–2	21 – C. Leger-Walker	10 – Motuga	4 – Tied	Marriott Center (1,483); Provo, UT
December 19, 2021 (Note: This game was added on December 16 to replace the previously canceled game at Cornell.)*; 11:00 am, ESPN+		at Stony Brook	L 62–69	8–3	19 – C. Leger-Walker	13 – Murekatete	5 – C. Leger-Walker	Island Federal Arena (253); Stony Brook, NY
December 19, 2021*; 12:00 pm, N/A		at Cornell	Canceled due to COVID-19 protocols within the Cornell program. (Note: This game was canceled on December 15 due to COVID-19 protocols within the Big Red program. This game was declared a no contest by the NCAA.)					Newman Arena; Ithaca, NY
December 31, 2021; 7:00 pm, P12N		California	W 69–42	9–3 (1–0)	22 – C. Leger-Walker	6 – K. Leger-Walker	6 – K. Leger-Walker	Beasley Coliseum (627); Pullman, WA
January 2, 2022; 12:00 pm, P12N		No. 2 Stanford	L 44–82	9–4 (1–1)	15 – C. Leger-Walker	8 – Wallack	3 – Tied	Beasley Coliseum (873); Pullman, WA
January 7, 2022; 5:00 pm, P12N		at No. 4 Arizona	L 52–60	9–5 (1–2)	12 – K. Leger-Walker	9 – K. Leger-Walker	6 – K. Leger-Walker	McKale Center (7,378); Tucson, AZ
January 9, 2022; 11:00 am, P12N		at Arizona State	Postponed due to COVID-19 protocols within the Arizona State program. (Note: This game was postponed on January 4 due to COVID-19 protocols within the Sun Devils program.)					Desert Financial Arena; Tempe, AZ
January 14, 2022; 7:00 pm, P12N		at USC	W 71–63	10–5 (2–2)	20 – Teder	6 – Murekatete	6 – K. Leger-Walker	Galen Center (0); Los Angeles, CA
January 16, 2022; 12:00 pm, P12N		at UCLA	L 58–71	10–6 (2–3)	24 – C. Leger-Walker	9 – Tied	4 – K. Leger-Walker	Pauley Pavilion (0); Los Angeles, CA
January 26, 2022 (Note: This game was originally scheduled for January 21 before being postponed and rescheduled to January 26 due to COVID-19 protocols within the Washington State program.); 1:00 pm, Live Stream		Oregon State	W 58–51	11–6 (3–3)	17 – Teder	6 – Tied	6 – K. Leger-Walker	Beasley Coliseum (654); Pullman, WA
January 28, 2022; 7:00 pm, P12N		Washington; Boeing Apple Cup Series	W 60–56 ^{OT}	12–6 (4–3)	18 – C. Leger-Walker	10 – Murekatete	3 – K. Leger-Walker	Beasley Coliseum (1,145); Pullman, WA
January 30, 2022; 12:00 pm, P12N		at Washington; Boeing Apple Cup Series	W 57–43	13–6 (5–3)	19 – C. Leger-Walker	7 – C. Leger-Walker	2 – K. Leger-Walker	Alaska Airlines Arena (3,023); Seattle, WA
February 4, 2022; 6:00 pm, P12N		at Colorado	W 63–56	14–6 (6–3)	30 – C. Leger-Walker	11 – Motuga	6 – K. Leger-Walker	CU Events Center (1,205); Boulder, CO
February 6, 2022; 11:00 am, P12N		at Utah	L 66–72	14–7 (6–4)	16 – Teder	6 – Teder	6 – Teder	Jon M. Huntsman Center (2,043); Salt Lake City, UT
February 9, 2022 (Note: This game was originally scheduled for January 23 before being postponed and rescheduled to February 9 due to COVID-19 protocols within the Washington State program.); 12:00 pm, P12N		No. 24 Oregon	L 30–83	14–8 (6–5)	9 – Murekatete	9 – Murekatete	3 – C. Leger-Walker	Beasley Coliseum (760); Pullman, WA
February 11, 2022; 7:00 pm, P12N		UCLA	W 66–65	15–8 (7–5)	22 – K. Leger-Walker	8 – C. Leger-Walker	5 – K. Leger-Walker	Beasley Coliseum (1,120); Pullman, WA
February 13, 2022; 12:00 pm, P12N		USC	W 57–54	16–8 (8–5)	20 – C. Leger-Walker	9 – Murekatete	5 – K. Leger-Walker	Beasley Coliseum (690); Pullman, WA
February 18, 2022; 7:00 pm, P12N		Arizona State	W 65–58	17–8 (9–5)	20 – Teder	6 – Murekatete	5 – C. Leger-Walker	Beasley Coliseum (874); Pullman, WA
February 20, 2022; 12:00 pm, P12N		No. 8 Arizona	W 72–67	18–8 (10–5)	21 – Teder	8 – Murekatete	6 – C. Leger-Walker	Beasley Coliseum (984); Pullman, WA
February 24, 2022; 8:00 pm, P12N		at No. 2 Stanford	L 54–61	18–9 (10–6)	17 – C. Leger-Walker	7 – Murekatete	5 – K. Leger-Walker	Maples Pavilion (3,009); Stanford, CA
February 26, 2022; 12:00 pm, P12N		at California	W 73–67	19–9 (11–6)	21 – C. Leger-Walker	8 – Murekatete	9 – K. Leger-Walker	Haas Pavilion (1,390); Berkeley, CA
Pac-12 Women's Tournament
March 3, 2022; 8:30 pm, P12N	(3)	vs. (6) Utah; Quarterfinals	L 59–70	19–10	18 – Murekatete	6 – Wallack	7 – C. Leger-Walker	Michelob Ultra Arena (4,428); Paradise, NV
NCAA tournament
March 19, 2022; 8:30 am, ESPN2	(8 B)	vs. (9 B) Kansas State; First Round	L 40–50	19–11	20 – C. Leger-Walker	14 – Motuga	2 – Motuga	Reynolds Coliseum (4,800); Raleigh, NC
*Non-conference game. ^{#}Rankings from AP Poll. (#) Tournament seedings in parentheses. B=Bridgeport. All times are in Pacific Time.

== Rankings ==
Ranking movements Legend: ██ Increase in ranking ██ Decrease in ranking — = Not ranked RV = Received votes
	Week																				
Poll	Pre	1	2	3	4	5	6	7	8	9	10	11	12	13	14	15	16	17	18	19	Final
AP	RV	RV*	RV	RV	RV	RV	RV	—	—	—	—	—	—	—	—	—	RV	RV	—	—	Not released
Coaches	RV	RV*	RV^	RV	RV	RV	RV	—	—	—	—	—	—	—	—	—	RV	RV	—	—	

*The preseason and week 1 polls were the same.
^Coaches did not release a week 2 poll.

== See also ==
- 2021–22 Washington State Cougars men's basketball team
