= 2022–23 Colorado Buffaloes women's basketball team =

American college basketball season

2022–23 Colorado Buffaloes women's basketball

NCAA tournament, Sweet Sixteen
- Conference: Pac-12 Conference

Ranking
- Coaches: No. 15
- AP: No. 21
- Record: 25–9 (13–5 Pac-12)
- Head coach: JR Payne (7th season)
- Assistant coaches: Toriano Towns; Alex Earl; Tim Hays
- Home arena: CU Events Center

2022–23 Pac-12 Conference women's basketball standings
	Conf.				Overall
Team	W		L	PCT	W		L	PCT
No. 8 Utah	15	–	3	.833	27	–	5	.844
No. 5 Stanford	15	–	3	.833	29	–	6	.829
No. 21 Colorado	13	–	5	.722	25	–	9	.735
No. 14 UCLA	11	–	7	.611	27	–	10	.730
No. 25 Arizona	11	–	7	.611	22	–	10	.688
USC	11	–	7	.611	21	–	10	.677
No. 23 Washington State †	9	–	9	.500	23	–	11	.676
Oregon	7	–	11	.389	20	–	15	.571
Washington	7	–	11	.389	19	–	15	.559
California	4	–	14	.222	13	–	17	.433
Oregon State	4	–	14	.222	13	–	18	.419
Arizona State	1	–	17	.056	8	–	20	.286
† 2023 Pac-12 Tournament winner Rankings from AP poll

The 2022–23 Colorado Buffaloes women's basketball team represented the University of Colorado Boulder during the 2022–23 NCAA Division I women's basketball season. The Buffaloes, led by seventh-year head coach JR Payne, played their home games at the CU Events Center and compete as members of the Pac-12 Conference.

== Previous season ==
The Buffaloes finished the season 22–9, 9–7 in Pac-12 play to finish in fifth place. As the fifth seed in the Pac-12 women's tournament they defeated Washington in the first round, Arizona in the quarterfinals before losing to Stanford in the semifinals. They received an automatic bid to the NCAA Women's Tournament as a 7th seed in the Greensboro Region, where they were upset by 10th seed Creighton in the first round.

The Buffaloes were the last undefeated DI women's college basketball in the 2021-22 season, losing their first game to #2 Stanford on January 14, 2022.

== Offseason ==
=== Departures ===
Colorado departures
Name	Num	Pos.	Height	Year	Hometown	Reason for departure
Leslia Finau	4	G	5'10"	Senior	Dublin, CA	Graduated
Kennedy Taylor	5	F	6'3"	Freshman	Shawnee Mission, KS	Transferred to Missouri State
Kylee Blacksten	13	G	6'3"	Sophomore	Colorado Springs, CO	Transferred to West Virginia
Maura Singer	20	C	6'4"	(redshirt) Freshman	Littleton, CO	Retired from basketball due to a knee injury
Mya Hollingshed	21	G/F	6'3"	Senior	Houston, TX	Graduated/2022 WNBA draft; selected 8th overall by Las Vegas Aces
Aubrey Knight	24	G	6'0"	Senior	Ventura, CA	Graduated
Sierna Tuitele	33	F	6'1"	Senior	Chico, CA	Graduated

=== Incoming ===
Colorado incoming transfers
Name	Num	Pos.	Height	Year	Hometown	Previous school
Aaronette Vonleh	21	C	6'3	Sophomore	West Linn, OR	Arizona

==== Recruiting ====
There was no recruiting class of 2022.

==== Recruiting class of 2023 ====
College recruiting (2023)
Name	Hometown	School	Height	Weight	Commit date
Kennedy Sanders; PG	Chaska, MN	Chaska High School	5 ft 8 in (1.73 m)	N/A	
Kennedy Sanders; PG	Recruit ratings: ESPN: (93)				
Ruthie Loomis-Goltl; F	Bridgeport, NE	Bridgeport High School	6 ft 3 in (1.91 m)	N/A	
Ruthie Loomis-Goltl; F	Recruit ratings: ESPN: (93)				
Overall recruit ranking:
Note: In many cases, Scout, Rivals, 247Sports, On3, and ESPN may conflict in their listings of height and weight.; In these cases, the average was taken. ESPN grades are on a 100-point scale.; Sources: "2023 Player Commits". ESPN. Archived from the original on January 20, 2023.

== Roster ==
2022–23 Colorado Buffaloes women's basketball team
Players
Coaches

Pos.	#	Name	Height	Year	Previous school	Hometown
G	00	Jaylyn Sherrod	5 ft 7 in (1.7 m)	Sr	Rasmay	Birmingham, AL
G	1	Tayanna Jones	6 ft 1 in (1.85 m)	GS	North Johnston; Georgetown	Selma, NC
G	2	Tameiya Sadler	5 ft 8 in (1.73 m)	Jr	St. Patrick-St. Vincent; Washington	Vallejo, CA
G	3	Frida Formann	5 ft 11 in (1.8 m)	Jr	Falkonergårdens Gymnasium	Bagsværd, Denmark
F	5	Ally Fitzgerald	6 ft 2 in (1.88 m)	Fr	Marquette HS	Ballwin, MO
G	10	Lizzie Holder	6 ft 1 in (1.85 m)	Fr	Stillwater Area HS	Stillwater, MN
C	11	Quay Miller	6 ft 3 in (1.91 m)	Sr	Kentridge; Washington	Renton, WA
G	15	Kindyll Wetta	5 ft 9 in (1.75 m)	So	Valor Christian	Castle Rock, CO
C	21	Aaronette Vonleh	6 ft 3 in (1.91 m)	So	West Linn; Arizona	West Linn, OR
F	23	Jada Wynn	6 ft 2 in (1.88 m)	Fr	Troy HS	Yorba Linda, CA
F	25	Brianna McLeod	6 ft 3 in (1.91 m)	Fr	Kings Christian	Brampton, ON
G	31	Sophie Gerber	6 ft 0 in (1.83 m)	So	Desert Mountain	Scottsdale, AZ
F	45	Charlotte Whittaker	6 ft 3 in (1.91 m)	Sr	St Andrew's College	Ventura, CA

Head coach

- JR Payne (Saint Mary's)

Assistant coach(es)

- Toriano Towns (Saint Mary's)
- Alex Earl (Arizona State)
- Tim Hays (Boise State)

Legend

- (C) Team captain
- (S) Suspended
- (I) Ineligible
- (W) Walk-on
- Injured
- Current redshirt

Roster

== Schedule ==
Date time, TV	Rank^{#}	Opponent^{#}	Result	Record	High points	High rebounds	High assists	Site (attendance) city, state
Exhibition
November 1, 2022*; 6:00 p.m.		Adams State	W 75–48		20 – Vonleh	16 – Jones	5 – Wetta	CU Events Center (332); Boulder, CO
Regular season
November 7, 2022*; 12:00 p.m.		New Mexico State	W 85–55	1–0	22 – Miller	17 – Miller	4 – Tied	CU Events Center (479); Boulder, CO
November 12, 2022*; 2:00 p.m.		Jackson State; Preseason WNIT	W 77–53	2–0	17 – Formann	6 – Miller	5 – Sherrod	CU Events Center (1,115); Boulder, CO
November 15, 2022*; 3:30 p.m., ESPN+		vs. Louisiana; Preseason WNIT	W 73–43	3–0	17 – Miller	8 – Miller	8 – Wetta	United Supermarkets Arena; Lubbock, TX
November 16, 2022*; 6:00 p.m., ESPN+		at Texas Tech; Preseason WNIT	L 85–86 ^{OT}	3–1	24 – Miller	13 – Miller	5 – Sherrod	United Supermarkets Arena (3,316); Lubbock, TX
November 19, 2022*; 2:00 p.m.		Air Force	W 71–63	4–1	15 – Tied	9 – Jones	8 – Sherrod	CU Events Center (1,248); Boulder, CO
November 25, 2022*; 5:00 p.m., SECN		at No. 23 Tennessee	L 51–69	4–2	13 – Wetta	6 – Wynn	3 – Sherrod	Thompson-Boling Arena (7,509); Knoxville, TN
November 27, 2022*; 11:00 a.m., FloSports		at Chicago State	W 83–32	5–2	18 – Vonleh	7 – Miller	10 – Sherrod	Jacoby Dickens Center (200); Chicago, IL
November 30, 2022*; 6:00 p.m.		Western Michigan	W 75–37	6–2	20 – Miller	9 – Jones	6 – Wetta	CU Events Center (511); Boulder, CO
December 4, 2022*; 1:00 p.m., MW Network		at Boise State	W 71–48	7–2	14 – Jones	9 – Jones	6 – Sherrod	ExtraMile Arena (844); Boise, ID
December 7, 2022*; 6:00 p.m.		Southern Utah	W 78–48	8–2	13 – Miller	6 – Jones	7 – Wetta	CU Events Center (573); Boulder, CO
December 14, 2022; 3:00 p.m., P12N		at No. 13 Utah	L 58–85	8–3 (0–1)	10 – Vonleh	9 – Miller	5 – Sherrod	Jon M. Huntsman Center (1,894); Salt Lake City, UT
December 16, 2022*; 6:00 p.m.		Alcorn State	W 82–47	9–3	21 – Formann	8 – McLeod	7 – Wetta	CU Events Center (546); Boulder, CO
December 21, 2022*; 11:00 a.m., FloSports		at Marquette	W 71–48	10–3	17 – Miller	7 – Tied	8 – Sherrod	Al McGuire Center (2,019); Milwaukee, WI
December 30, 2022; 3:00 p.m., P12N		at Washington	W 64–56	11–3 (1–1)	14 – Miller	8 – Miller	6 – Sherrod	Alaska Airlines Arena (2,318); Seattle, WA
January 1, 2023; 5:00 p.m., P12N		at Washington State	W 65–54	12–3 (2–1)	20 – Vonleh	8 – Miller	7 – Sherrod	Beasley Coliseum (680); Pullman, WA
January 6, 2023; 7:00 p.m., P12N		No. 8 Utah	W 77–67	13–3 (3–1)	20 – Formann	6 – Miller	7 – Sherrod	CU Events Center (1,575); Boulder, CO
January 13, 2023; 7:00 p.m., P12N		No. 14 Arizona	W 72–65	14–3 (4–1)	23 – Formann	9 – Tied	5 – Wetta	CU Events Center (1,974); Boulder, CO
January 15, 2023; 12:00 p.m.		Arizona State	W 2–0 Forfeit	14–3 (5–1)	–	–	–	CU Events Center; Boulder, CO
January 20, 2023; 12:30 p.m., P12N	No. 24	at California	W 73–66	15–3 (6–1)	26 – Miller	8 – Tied	3 – Tied	Haas Pavilion (2,394); Berkeley, CA
January 22, 2023; 3:00 p.m., P12N	No. 24	at No. 4 Stanford	L 49–62	15–4 (6–2)	16 – Sherrod	10 – Vonleh	3 – Formann	Maples Pavilion (4,122); Stanford, CA
January 27, 2023; 7:00 p.m., P12N	No. 25	No. 8 UCLA	W 73–70 ^{OT}	16–4 (7–2)	20 – Sherrod	12 – Miller	6 – Sherrod	CU Events Center (2,227); Boulder, CO
January 29, 2023; 12:00 p.m., P12N	No. 25	USC	L 54–71	16–5 (7–3)	16 – Vonleh	11 – Miller	4 – Tied	CU Events Center (2,377); Boulder, CO
February 3, 2023; 8:00 p.m., P12N		at Oregon	W 63–53	17–5 (8–3)	19 – Vonleh	10 – Miller	7 – Sherrod	Matthew Knight Arena (5,919); Eugene, OR
February 5, 2023; 1:00 p.m., P12N		at Oregon State	W 67–48	18–5 (9–3)	15 – Tied	19 – Miller	7 – Sherrod	Gill Coliseum (4,338); Corvallis, OR
February 10, 2023; 7:00 p.m., P12N	No. 25	Washington State	W 71–68	19–5 (10–3)	27 – Sherrod	7 – Miller	5 – Wetta	CU Events Center (2,055); Boulder, CO
February 12, 2023; 12:00 p.m., P12N	No. 25	Washington	W 65–43	20–5 (11–3)	17 – Miller	12 – Miller	6 – Tied	CU Events Center (2,148); Boulder, CO
February 17, 2023; 11:00 a.m., P12N	No. 21	at Arizona State	W 70–62	21–5 (12–3)	17 – Miller	10 – Miller	5 – Sherrod	Desert Financial Arena (2,793); Tempe, AZ
February 19, 2023; 12:00 p.m., P12N	No. 21	at No. 18 Arizona	L 42–61	21–6 (12–4)	12 – Sadler	10 – Miller	2 – Sherrod	McKale Center (8,267); Tucson, AZ
February 23, 2023; 3:00 p.m., P12N	No. 21	No. 3 Stanford	L 62–73 ^{2OT}	21–7 (12–5)	19 – Sherrod	8 – Tied	4 – Sherrod	CU Events Center (2,963); Boulder, CO
February 25, 2023; 12:00 p.m., P12N	No. 21	California	W 95–69	22–7 (13–5)	25 – Vonleh	11 – Miller	6 – Tied	CU Events Center (3,452); Boulder, CO
Pac-12 Women's Tournament
March 2, 2023; 9:30 p.m., P12N	(3) No. 20	vs. (11) Oregon State; Quarterfinals	W 62–54	23–7	16 – Formann	7 – Tied	3 – Formann	Michelob Ultra Arena (4,207); Paradise, NV
March 3, 2023; 9:30 p.m., P12N	(3) No. 20	vs. (7) Washington State; Semifinals	L 49–61	23–8	18 – Vonleh	6 – Wetta	6 – Sherrod	Michelob Ultra Arena; Paradise, NV
NCAA tournament
March 18, 2023*; 5:00 p.m., ESPNews	(6 S4) No. 21	vs. (11 S4) Middle Tennessee; First Round	W 82–60	24–8	21 – Formann	8 – Miller	4 – Sherrod	Cameron Indoor Stadium (1,456); Durham, NC
March 20, 2023*; 7:00 p.m., ESPNU	(6 S4) No. 21	at (3 S4) No. 13 Duke; Second Round	W 61–53 ^{OT}	25–8	17 – Miller	14 – Miller	3 – Tied	Cameron Indoor Stadium (1,904); Durham, NC
March 24, 2023*; 5:30 p.m., ESPN	(6 S4) No. 21	vs. (2 S4) No. 3 Iowa; Sweet Sixteen	L 77–87	25–9	21 – Formann	14 – Miller	9 – Sherrod	Climate Pledge Arena (9,626); Seattle, WA
*Non-conference game. ^{#}Rankings from AP Poll. (#) Tournament seedings in parentheses. S4=Seattle 4. All times are in Mountain Time.

== Rankings ==
Ranking movements Legend: ██ Increase in ranking ██ Decrease in ranking — = Not ranked RV = Received votes
	Week																				
Poll	Pre	1	2	3	4	5	6	7	8	9	10	11	12	13	14	15	16	17	18	19	Final
AP	—	—*	—	—	—	—	—	—	—	—	RV	24	25	RV	25	21	21	20	20	21	Not released
Coaches	—	—*	—^	—	—	—	—	—	—	—	RV	RV	RV	RV	25	21	22	21	21	21	15

*The preseason and week 1 polls were the same.
^Coaches did not release a week 2 poll.
