= 2022–23 Washington Huskies women's basketball team =

American college basketball season

2022–23 Washington Huskies women's basketball

WNIT, Fab 4
- Conference: Pac-12 Conference
- Record: 19–15 (7–11 Pac-12)
- Head coach: Tina Langley (2nd season)
- Assistant coaches: Dan Tacheny; Katie Faulkner; Latara King
- Home arena: Alaska Airlines Arena

2022–23 Pac-12 Conference women's basketball standings
	Conf.				Overall
Team	W		L	PCT	W		L	PCT
No. 8 Utah	15	–	3	.833	27	–	5	.844
No. 5 Stanford	15	–	3	.833	29	–	6	.829
No. 21 Colorado	13	–	5	.722	25	–	9	.735
No. 14 UCLA	11	–	7	.611	27	–	10	.730
No. 25 Arizona	11	–	7	.611	22	–	10	.688
USC	11	–	7	.611	21	–	10	.677
No. 23 Washington State †	9	–	9	.500	23	–	11	.676
Oregon	7	–	11	.389	20	–	15	.571
Washington	7	–	11	.389	19	–	15	.559
California	4	–	14	.222	13	–	17	.433
Oregon State	4	–	14	.222	13	–	18	.419
Arizona State	1	–	17	.056	8	–	20	.286
† 2023 Pac-12 Tournament winner Rankings from AP poll

The 2022–23 Washington Huskies women's basketball team represented the University of Washington during the 2022–23 NCAA Division I women's basketball season. The Huskies, led by second-year head coach Tina Langley, played their home games at Alaska Airlines Arena at Hec Edmundson Pavilion in Seattle, Washington and competed as members of the Pac-12 Conference.

== Offseason ==
=== Previous season ===
The Huskies finished the 2021–22 season 7–16, 2–12 in Pac-12 play to finish in last place. As the No. 12 seed in the Pac-12 tournament, they lost in the first round to Colorado.

=== Departures ===
Washington departures
Name	Num	Pos.	Height	Year	Hometown	Reason fordDeparture
Jess Finney	0	G	6'0"	Freshman	Scottsdale, AZ	Transferred to San Diego
Marisa Davis-Jones	1	F	6'1"	Freshman	Surprise, AZ	Transferred to San Jose State
Tameiya Sadler	3	C	6'3"	Sophomore	Colbert, WA	Transferred to Colorado
Olivia Pollerd	12	F	6'2"	Freshman	Mount Martha, Australia	Transferred to Santa Clara
Alexis Whitfield	23	F	6'2"	Freshman	West Hills, CA	Transferred to UC Santa Barbara
Nancy Mulkey	32	C	6'9"	Senior	Cypress, TX	Graduated
Callie Lind	41	G	5'9"	Sophomore	Sammamish, WA	Walk-on; didn't return
Missy Peterson	44	G	5'11"	Senior	Edmonds, WA	Graduated

=== Incoming ===
Washington incoming transfers
Name	Num	Pos.	Height	Year	Hometown	Previous school
Dalayah Daniels	14	G/F	6'3"	Junior	Seattle, WA	California
Emma Grothaus	21	F	6'3"	GS senior	Mahtomedi, MN	Lehigh

==== Recruiting ====
College recruiting
Name	Hometown	School	Height	Weight	Commit date
Hannah Stines; G	Garden Grove, CA	Orangewood Academy (CA)	5 ft 10 in (1.78 m)	N/A	
Hannah Stines; G	Recruit ratings: ESPN: (95)				
Elle Ladine; G	Sunnyvale, CA	Pinewood School (CA)	5 ft 11 in (1.80 m)	N/A	
Elle Ladine; G	Recruit ratings: ESPN: (94)				
Teagan Brown; G	El Dorado Hills, CA	Oak Ridge H.S. (CA)	5 ft 10 in (1.78 m)	N/A	
Teagan Brown; G	Recruit ratings: ESPN: (92)				
Overall recruit ranking:
Note: In many cases, Scout, Rivals, 247Sports, On3, and ESPN may conflict in their listings of height and weight.; In these cases, the average was taken. ESPN grades are on a 100-point scale.; Sources: "2022 Player Commits". ESPN. Archived from the original on December 28, 2022.

==== Recruiting class of 2023 ====
College recruiting (2023)
Name	Hometown	School	Height	Weight	Commit date
Sayvia Sellers; PG	Anchorage, AK	Anchorage Christian	5 ft 7 in (1.70 m)	N/A	
Sayvia Sellers; PG	Recruit ratings: ESPN: (95)				
Ari Long; PG	Moreno Valley, CA	Valley View High School	6 ft 0 in (1.83 m)	N/A	
Ari Long; PG	Recruit ratings: ESPN: (94)				
Chloe Briggs; G	Ontario, CA	Ontario Christian School	5 ft 10 in (1.78 m)	N/A	
Chloe Briggs; G	Recruit ratings: ESPN: (92)				
Overall recruit ranking:
Note: In many cases, Scout, Rivals, 247Sports, On3, and ESPN may conflict in their listings of height and weight.; In these cases, the average was taken. ESPN grades are on a 100-point scale.; Sources: "2023 Player Commits". ESPN. Archived from the original on December 28, 2022.

== Roster ==
2022–23 Washington Huskies women's basketball team
Players
Coaches

Pos.	#	Name	Height	Year	Previous school	Hometown
G	1	Hannah Stines	5 ft 11 in (1.8 m)	Fr	Orangewood Academy	La Mirada, CA
F	2	Lauren Schwartz	5 ft 11 in (1.8 m)	Jr	Larry A. Ryle; Rice	Union, KY
G	3	Jayda Noble	5 ft 11 in (1.8 m)	So	Mount Spokane	Spokane, WA
G	5	Teagan Brown	5 ft 10 in (1.78 m)	Fr	Oak Ridge	Sacramento, CA
F	11	Haley Van Dyke	6 ft 1 in (1.85 m)	Sr	Campolindo	Walnut Creek, CA
F	14	Dalayah Daniels	6 ft 4 in (1.93 m)	Jr	Garfield; California	Seattle, WA
G	15	Nia Lowery	5 ft 11 in (1.8 m)	RS Jr	C. K. McClatchy	Sacramento, CA
C	21	Emma Grothaus	6 ft 4 in (1.93 m)	Sr	Mahtomedi; Lehigh	Mahtomedi, MN
F	22	Shayla Gillmer (W)	6 ft 1 in (1.85 m)	Fr	Ontario Christian	San Clemete, CA
G	24	Elle Ladine	5 ft 11 in (1.8 m)	Fr	Pinewood	San Francisco, CA
G	25	T. T. Watkins	5 ft 11 in (1.8 m)	Sr	Walnut	Walnut, CA
G	33	Trinity Oliver	5 ft 9 in (1.75 m)	Sr	Trinity; Baylor	Euless, TX
G	35	Alexis Griggsby	5 ft 9 in (1.75 m)	Sr	Sierra Canyon	Northridge, CA
F	53	Darcy Rees	6 ft 4 in (1.93 m)	Sr	Adelaide	Adelaide, South Australia

Head coach

- Tina Langley (West Alabama)

Assistant coach(es)

- Dan Tacheny (UNLV)
- Katie Faulkner (Montana)
- Latara King (Florida Memorial)

Legend

- (C) Team captain
- (S) Suspended
- (I) Ineligible
- (W) Walk-on
- Injured
- Current redshirt

Roster

== Schedule ==
Date time, TV	Rank^{#}	Opponent^{#}	Result	Record	High points	High rebounds	High assists	Site (attendance) city, state
Exhibition
October 31, 2022*; 6:00 p.m.		Warner Pacific	W 115–24		17 – Stines	5 – Gillmer	6 – Stines	Alaska Airlines Arena (N/A); Seattle, WA
Regular season
November 7, 2022*; 5:00 p.m.		Utah Tech	W 87–74	1–0	18 – Oliver	12 – Grothaus	5 – Ladine	Alaska Airlines Arena (1,513); Seattle, WA
November 11, 2022*; 5:00 p.m.		UC Davis	W 82–60	2–0	16 – Daniels	6 – Van Dyke	3 – Tied	Alaska Airlines Arena (1,943); Seattle, WA
November 17, 2022*; 5:00 p.m., P12N		UC Irvine	W 62–60 ^{2OT}	3–0	23 – Daniels	14 – Daniels	2 – Tied	Alaska Airlines Arena (1,362); Seattle, WA
November 20, 2022*; 5:00 p.m., P12N		Idaho State	W 56–39	4–0	12 – Daniels	7 – Noble	2 – Tied	Alaska Airlines Arena (3,859); Seattle, WA
November 25, 2022*; 1:30 p.m.		vs. Fordham; Las Vegas Holiday Classic	W 71–62	5–0	21 – Grothaus	10 – Oliver	5 – Van Dyke	Orleans Arena (N/A); Paradise, NV
November 26, 2022*; 1:30 p.m.		vs. Santa Clara; Las Vegas Holiday Classic	L 58–71	5–1	13 – Stines	6 – Ladine	2 – Tied	Orleans Arena (N/A); Paradise, NV
November 30, 2022*; 7:00 p.m.		Seattle	W 60–49	6–1	17 – Daniels	15 – Daniels	3 – Stines	Alaska Airlines Arena (1,686); Seattle, WA
December 4, 2022*; 3:00 p.m.		Queens (NC)	W 54–28	7–1	9 – Stines	6 – Oliver	6 – Van Dyke	Alaska Airlines Arena (1,660); Seattle, WA
December 11, 2022; 2:00 p.m., P12N		Washington State	W 82–66	8–1 (1–0)	21 – Schwartz	10 – Daniels	3 – Tied	Alaska Airlines Arena (2,753); Seattle, WA
December 18, 2022*; 12:00 p.m.		Liberty; Husky Classic	L 54–66	8–2	13 – Van Dyke	8 – Noble	2 – Tied	Alaska Airlines Arena (1,493); Seattle, WA
December 20, 2022*; 12:00 p.m.		SIU Edwardsville; Husky Classic	W 71–40	9–2	15 – Daniels	9 – Daniels	5 – Ladine	Alaska Airlines Arena (1,291); Seattle, WA
December 30, 2022; 2:00 p.m., P12N		Colorado	L 56–64	9–3 (1–1)	14 – Noble	6 – Noble	5 – Noble	Alaska Airlines Arena (2,318); Seattle, WA
January 1, 2023; 12:00 p.m., P12N		No. 11 Utah	L 53–61	9–4 (1–2)	17 – Schwartz	10 – Daniels	4 – Daniels	Alaska Airlines Arena (2,286); Seattle, WA
January 8, 2023; 12:00 p.m., P12N		at Washington State	L 52–66	9–5 (1–3)	10 – Daniels	6 – Tied	2 – Tied	Beasley Coliseum (1,057); Pullman, WA
January 13, 2023; 7:00 p.m., P12N		at No. 21 Oregon	L 58–65	9–6 (1–4)	14 – Tied	8 – Oliver	3 – Tied	Matthew Knight Arena (6,497); Eugene, OR
January 15, 2023; 12:00 p.m., P12N		at Oregon State	W 79–67	10–6 (2–4)	17 – Tied	6 – Schwartz	5 – Stines	Gill Coliseum (4,122); Corvallis, OR
January 20, 2023; 7:00 p.m., P12N		No. 9 UCLA	L 47–51	10–7 (2–5)	9 – Noble	11 – Oliver	3 – Noble	Alaska Airlines Arena (2,265); Seattle, WA
January 22, 2023; 12:00 p.m., P12N		USC	L 54–63 ^{OT}	10–8 (2–6)	17 – Daniels	9 – Daniels	3 – Tied	Alaska Airlines Arena (2,543); Seattle, WA
January 27, 2023; 6:00 p.m., P12N		at No. 19 Arizona	L 54–61	10–9 (2–7)	16 – Van Dyke	8 – Van Dyke	3 – Tied	McKale Center (7,884); Tucson, AZ
January 29, 2023; 11:00 a.m., P12N		at Arizona State	W 55–53	11–9 (3–7)	14 – Daniels	8 – Tied	5 – Schwartz	Desert Financial Arena (1,851); Tempe, AZ
February 3, 2023; 7:00 p.m., P12N		California	W 70–54	12–9 (4–7)	20 – Daniels	10 – Noble	5 – Van Dyke	Alaska Airlines Arena (3,496); Seattle, WA
February 5, 2023; 12:00 p.m., P12N		No. 2 Stanford	W 72–67	13–9 (5–7)	21 – Ladine	10 – Van Dyke	5 – Noble	Alaska Airlines Arena (4,317); Seattle, WA
February 10, 2023; 6:00 p.m., P12N		at No. 7 Utah	L 69–92	13–10 (5–8)	18 – Ladine	5 – Tied	5 – Tied	Jon M. Huntsman Center (3,725); Salt Lake City, UT
February 12, 2023; 11:00 a.m., P12N		at No. 25 Colorado	L 43–65	13–11 (5–9)	9 – Schwartz	7 – Van Dyke	3 – Noble	CU Events Center (2,148); Boulder, CO
February 17, 2023; 7:00 p.m., P12N		Oregon State	W 64–59	14–11 (6–9)	17 – Van Dyke	8 – Noble	9 – Noble	Alaska Airlines Arena (2,192); Seattle, WA
February 19, 2023; 1:00 p.m., P12N		Oregon	W 68–60	15–11 (7–9)	13 – Schwartz	9 – Van Dyke	4 – Tied	Alaska Airlines Arena (3,475); Seattle, WA
February 23, 2023; 8:00 p.m., P12N		at USC	L 43–47	15–12 (7–10)	9 – Ladine	7 – Daniels	4 – Daniels	Galen Center (842); Los Angeles, CA
February 25, 2023; 12:00 p.m., P12N		at No. 17 UCLA	L 62–70	15–13 (7–11)	12 – Van Dyke	9 – Noble	3 – Schwartz	Pauley Pavilion (4,375); Los Angeles, CA
Pac-12 Women's Tournament
March 1, 2023; 2:30 p.m., P12N	(8)	vs. (9) Oregon; First round	L 50–52	15–14	12 – Van Dyke	11 – Daniels	3 – Tied	Michelob Ultra Arena (3,292); Paradise, NV
WNIT
March 16, 2023*; 7:00 p.m.		San Francisco; First round	W 61–46	16–14	14 – Daniels	11 – Daniels	4 – Ladine	Alaska Airlines Arena (1,110); Seattle, WA
March 19, 2023*; 5:00 p.m.		New Mexico; Second round	W 67–56	17–14	15 – Tied	11 – Daniels	3 – Tied	Alaska Airlines Arena (1,455); Seattle, WA
March 24, 2023*; 7:00 p.m.		Kansas State; Super 16	W 55–48	18–14	17 – Tied	8 – Oliver	4 – Van Dyke	Alaska Airlines Arena (3,245); Seattle, WA
March 26, 2023*; 3:00 p.m.		Oregon; Great 8	W 63–59	19–14	16 – Ladine	13 – Daniels	6 – Ladine	Alaska Airlines Arena (3,052); Seattle, WA
March 29, 2023*; 4:30 p.m., ESPN+		at Kansas; Fab 4	L 36–61	19–15	10 – Daniels	13 – Daniels	4 – Noble	Allen Fieldhouse (7,229); Lawrence, KS
*Non-conference game. ^{#}Rankings from AP Poll. (#) Tournament seedings in parentheses. All times are in Pacific Time.

== See also ==
- 2022–23 Washington Huskies men's basketball team
