= 2022–23 Oregon Ducks women's basketball team =

2022–23 Oregon Ducks women's basketball

WNIT, Great 8
- Conference: Pac-12 Conference
- Record: 20–15 (7–11 Pac-12)
- Head coach: Kelly Graves (9th season)
- Associate head coach: Jodie Berry
- Assistant coaches: Jackie Nared Hairston; Sadie Edwards
- Home arena: Matthew Knight Arena

2022–23 Pac-12 Conference women's basketball standings
	Conf.				Overall
Team	W		L	PCT	W		L	PCT
No. 8 Utah	15	–	3	.833	27	–	5	.844
No. 5 Stanford	15	–	3	.833	29	–	6	.829
No. 21 Colorado	13	–	5	.722	25	–	9	.735
No. 14 UCLA	11	–	7	.611	27	–	10	.730
No. 25 Arizona	11	–	7	.611	22	–	10	.688
USC	11	–	7	.611	21	–	10	.677
No. 23 Washington State †	9	–	9	.500	23	–	11	.676
Oregon	7	–	11	.389	20	–	15	.571
Washington	7	–	11	.389	19	–	15	.559
California	4	–	14	.222	13	–	17	.433
Oregon State	4	–	14	.222	13	–	18	.419
Arizona State	1	–	17	.056	8	–	20	.286
† 2023 Pac-12 Tournament winner Rankings from AP poll

The 2022–23 Oregon Ducks women's basketball team represented the University of Oregon during the 2022–23 NCAA Division I women's basketball season. The Ducks are led by ninth-year head coach Kelly Graves, and they played their home games at Matthew Knight Arena as members of the Pac-12 Conference.

== Previous season ==
The Ducks finished the season at 20–12 and 11–6 in Pac-12 play to finish in a tie for second place. They received a bye in the Pac-12 Tournament and they defeated UCLA in the quarterfinals before losing to Utah in the semifinals. They received an at-large bid to the NCAA Women's Tournament where they were upset by Belmont in the first round.

== Offseason ==
=== Departures ===
Due to COVID-19 disruptions throughout NCAA sports in 2020–21, the NCAA announced that the 2020–21 season would not count against the athletic eligibility of any individual involved in an NCAA winter sport, including women's basketball. This meant that all seniors in 2020–21 had the option to return for 2021–22.

Name	Number	Pos.	Height	Year	Hometown	Reason left
Nyara Sabally	1	F	6'5"	RS Junior	Berlin, Germany	Declare for 2022 WNBA draft
Taylor Bigby	3	G	6'1"	Freshman	Las Vegas, NV	Transferred to USC
Shannon Dufficy	5	F	6'2"	Senior	Melbourne, Australia	Graduated
Chanaya Pinto	10	F	6'1"	Junior	Maputo, Mozambique	Transferred to Penn State
Kylee Watson	22	F	6'4"	Sophomore	Linwood, NJ	Transferred to Notre Dame
Maddie Scherr	23	G	5'11'	Sophomore	Florence, KY	Transferred to Kentucky
Sydney Parrish	33	G	6'2"	Sophomore	Fishers, IN	Transferred to Indiana

=== Incoming transfers ===
Name	Number	Pos.	Height	Year	Hometown	Date eligible	Years eligible	Previous school
Taya Hanson	0	G	5'10"	Senior	Kelowna, BC	April 23, 2022	1	Arizona State

==== Recruiting ====
College recruiting information
Name	Hometown	School	Height	Weight	Commit date
Chance Gray; PG	Hamilton, OH	Winton Woods High School	5 ft 9 in (1.75 m)	N/A	
Chance Gray; PG	Recruit ratings: ESPN: (97)				
Grace VanSlooten; F	Ottawa, OH	IMG Academy	6 ft 3 in (1.91 m)	N/A	
Grace VanSlooten; F	Recruit ratings: ESPN: (97)				
Jennah Isai; W	Surprise, AZ	Valley Vista High School	5 ft 11 in (1.80 m)	N/A	
Jennah Isai; W	Recruit ratings: ESPN: (95)				
Kennedy Basham; P	Phoenix, AZ	PHH Prep	6 ft 7 in (2.01 m)	N/A	
Kennedy Basham; P	Recruit ratings: ESPN: (94)				
Overall recruit ranking:
Note: In many cases, Scout, Rivals, 247Sports, On3, and ESPN may conflict in their listings of height and weight.; In these cases, the average was taken. ESPN grades are on a 100-point scale.; Sources: "2022 Player Commits". ESPN. Archived from the original on January 11, 2023.

==== Recruiting class of 2023 ====
College recruiting information (2023)
Name	Hometown	School	Height	Weight	Commit date
Sofia Bell; W	Portland, OR	Jesuit High School	6 ft 1 in (1.85 m)	N/A	
Sofia Bell; W	Recruit ratings: ESPN: (95)				
Sammie Wagner; W	San Antonio, TX	Ronald Reagan High School	6 ft 1 in (1.85 m)	N/A	
Sammie Wagner; W	Recruit ratings: ESPN: (94)				
Sarah Rambus; F	Bradenton, FL	IMG Academy	6 ft 3 in (1.91 m)	N/A	
Sarah Rambus; F	Recruit ratings: ESPN: (93)				
Overall recruit ranking:
Note: In many cases, Scout, Rivals, 247Sports, On3, and ESPN may conflict in their listings of height and weight.; In these cases, the average was taken. ESPN grades are on a 100-point scale.; Sources: "2023 Player Commits". ESPN. Archived from the original on January 11, 2023.

== Roster ==
2022–23 Oregon Ducks women's basketball team
Players
Coaches

Pos.	#	Name	Height	Year	Previous school	Hometown
G	0	Taya Hanson	5 ft 10 in (1.78 m)	Sr	Kelowna HS; Arizona State	Kelowna, BC
F	1	Kennedy Basham	6 ft 7 in (2.01 m)	Fr	PHH Prep	Phoenix, AZ
G	2	Chance Gray	5 ft 9 in (1.75 m)	Fr	Winton Woods HS	Cincinnati, OH
G	3	Ahlise Hurst	5 ft 9 in (1.75 m)	GS	Bendigo Sr. Secondary; New Mexico	Bendigo, Australia
G	4	Endyia Rogers	5 ft 7 in (1.7 m)	Sr	Bishop Lynch HS; USC	Dallas, TX
F	11	Taylor Hosendove	6 ft 2 in (1.88 m)	GS	Westlake HS; Clemson; Georgia State	Atlanta, GA
F	12	Te-Hina Paopao	5 ft 9 in (1.75 m)	Jr	La Jolla Country Day	Oceanside, CA
C	15	Phillipina Kyei	6 ft 8 in (2.03 m)	So	Crestwood Prep	Calgary, AB
G	23	Jennah Isai (T)	5 ft 11 in (1.8 m)	Fr	Valley Vista HS	Surprise, AZ
F	32	Sedona Prince (injured)	6 ft 7 in (2.01 m)	RS Sr	Liberty Hill HS; Texas	Liberty Hill, TX
F	40	Grace VanSlooten	6 ft 3 in (1.91 m)	Fr	IMG Academy	Toledo, OH

Head coach

- Kelly Graves (New Mexico)

Assistant coach(es)

- Jodie Berry (Western Washington)
- Jackie Nared Hairston (Saint Mary's)
- Sadie Edwards (USC)

Legend

- (C) Team captain
- (S) Suspended
- (I) Ineligible
- (W) Walk-on
- Injured
- Current redshirt

Roster

== Schedule ==
Date time, TV	Rank^{#}	Opponent^{#}	Result	Record	High points	High rebounds	High assists	Site (attendance) city, state
Exhibition
October 28, 2022*; 6:00 p.m.	No. 20	Carroll (MT)	W 72–41		12 – Tied	9 – VanSlooten	3 – Isai	Matthew Knight Arena (5,647); Eugene, OR
Regular Season
November 7, 2022*; 3:30 p.m.	No. 20	Northwestern	W 100–57	1–0	20 – VanSlooten	8 – Kyei	8 – Rogers	Matthew Knight Arena (5,661); Eugene, OR
November 12, 2022*; 11:00 a.m.	No. 20	Seattle	W 90–47	2–0	16 – VanSlooten	9 – VanSlooten	3 – Tied	Matthew Knight Arena (6,175); Eugene, OR
November 14, 2022*; 4:30 p.m., ESPN+/P12N	No. 21	at Southern; Pac-12/SWAC Legacy Series	W 83–46	3–0	15 – Hurst	10 – Kyei	5 – Paopao	F. G. Clark Center (2,752); Baton Rouge, LA
November 21, 2022*; 6:30 p.m.	No. 18	Southern Utah	W 66–54	4–0	17 – Paopao	9 – Kyei	4 – Paopao	Matthew Knight Arena (6,148); Eugene, OR
November 24, 2022*; 2:00 p.m., ESPNU	No. 18	vs. No. 8 North Carolina; Phil Knight Invitational semifinals	L 79–85	4–1	18 – Paopao	11 – Tied	5 – Rogers	Chiles Center; Portland, OR
November 27, 2022*; 10:00 a.m., ESPN2	No. 18	vs. Michigan State; Phil Knight Invitational 3rd place game	W 86–78	5–1	19 – Rogers	16 – Kyei	6 – Paopao	Veterans Memorial Coliseum; Portland, OR
December 3, 2022*; 2:00 p.m., P12N	No. 19	Portland	W 90–51	6–1	20 – Gray	13 – Kyei	8 – Paopao	Matthew Knight Arena (5,892); Eugene, OR
December 11, 2022; 4:00 p.m., P12N	No. 17	Oregon State; Rivalry	W 75–67	7–1 (1–0)	34 – Rogers	9 – Tied	9 – Rogers	Matthew Knight Arena (6,990); Eugene, OR
December 15, 2022*; 6:00 p.m.	No. 17	Eastern Washington	W 88–38	8–1	26 – VanSlooten	18 – Kyei	5 – Kyei	Matthew Knight Arena (5,584); Eugene, OR
December 18, 2022*; 12:00 p.m.	No. 17	Charleston	W 97–33	9–1	15 – Tied	13 – Kyei	6 – Gray	Matthew Knight Arena (5,827); Eugene, OR
December 20, 2022*; 1:00 p.m., FloSports	No. 16	vs. No. 17 Arkansas; San Diego Invitational semifinals	W 85–78	10–1	26 – VanSlooten	14 – Kyei	6 – Rogers	Pechanga Arena (321); San Diego, CA
December 21, 2022*; 3:30 p.m., FloSports	No. 16	vs. No. 3 Ohio State; San Diego Invitational championship	L 67–84	10–2	29 – VanSlooten	10 – Kyei	4 – Paopao	Pechanga Arena (378); San Diego, CA
December 30, 2022; 6:00 p.m., P12N	No. 17	No. 10 UCLA	L 74–82	10–3 (1–1)	18 – Rogers	10 – Tied	5 – Rogers	Matthew Knight Arena (6,726); Eugene, OR
January 1, 2023; 2:00 p.m., P12N	No. 17	USC	W 73–45	11–3 (2–1)	19 – Rogers	20 – Kyei	6 – Rogers	Matthew Knight Arena (6,031); Eugene, OR
January 6, 2023; 5:00 p.m., P12N	No. 18	at Arizona State	W 82–62	12–3 (3–1)	19 – Rogers	18 – Kyei	7 – Paopao	Desert Financial Arena (1,876); Tempe, AZ
January 8, 2023; 4:00 p.m., ESPN2	No. 18	at No. 15 Arizona	L 71–79	12–4 (3–2)	18 – VanSlooten	10 – Kyei	4 – Tied	McKale Center (7,963); Tucson, AZ
January 13, 2023; 7:00 p.m., P12N	No. 21	Washington	W 65–58	13–4 (4–2)	16 – Paopao	9 – Kyei	5 – Paopao	Matthew Knight Arena (6,497); Eugene, OR
January 15, 2023; 12:00 p.m., P12N	No. 21	Washington State	L 84–85 ^{OT}	13–5 (4–3)	33 – Rogers	7 – Tied	4 – Hosendove	Matthew Knight Arena (6,900); Eugene, OR
January 20, 2023; 8:00 p.m., P12N	No. 23	at Oregon State; Rivalry	L 65–68	13–6 (4–4)	18 – Gray	10 – Kyei	7 – Rogers	Gill Coliseum (5,975); Corvallis, OR
January 27, 2023; 7:00 p.m., P12N		at California	W 78–73	14–6 (5–4)	20 – VanSlooten	9 – VanSlooten	5 – Rogers	Haas Pavilion (1,005); Berkeley, CA
January 29, 2023; 1:00 p.m., P12N		at No. 3 Stanford	L 54–62	14–7 (5–5)	12 – Tied	17 – Kyei	3 – VanSlooten	Maples Pavilion (5,133); Stanford, CA
February 3, 2023; 7:00 p.m., P12N		Colorado	L 53–63	14–8 (5–6)	15 – Tied	7 – Tied	5 – Gray	Matthew Knight Arena (5,919); Eugene, OR
February 5, 2023; 2:00 p.m., P12N		No. 7 Utah	L 92–100	14–9 (5–7)	35 – Rogers	9 – Hosendove	5 – Rogers	Matthew Knight Arena (6,289); Eugene, OR
February 10, 2023; 7:00 p.m., P12N		at USC	L 51–56	14–10 (5–8)	14 – Rogers	15 – Kyei	4 – Rogers	Galen Center (1,126); Los Angeles, CA
February 12, 2023; 12:00 p.m., P12N		at No. 18 UCLA	L 57–67	14–11 (5–9)	19 – Rogers	13 – Kyei	4 – Tied	Pauley Pavilion (3,629); Los Angeles, CA
February 17, 2023; 7:00 p.m., P12N		at Washington State	L 57–64	14–12 (5–10)	18 – Gray	9 – Kyei	1 – Tied	Beasley Coliseum (1,061); Pullman, WA
February 19, 2023; 1:00 p.m., P12N		at Washington	L 60–68	14–13 (5–11)	22 – Paopao	11 – Kyei	4 – Rogers	Alaska Airlines Arena (3,475); Seattle, WA
February 23, 2023; 7:00 p.m., P12N		No. 14 Arizona	W 73–59	15–13 (6–11)	21 – Paopao	14 – Kyei	4 – Rogers	Matthew Knight Arena (6,173); Eugene, OR
February 25, 2023; 12:00 p.m., P12N		Arizona State	W 77–48	16–13 (7–11)	23 – Paopao	10 – Hanson	3 – Tied	Matthew Knight Arena (6,757); Eugene, OR
Pac-12 Women's Tournament
March 1, 2023; 2:30 p.m., P12N	(9)	vs. (8) Washington; First Round	W 52–50	17–13	28 – Rogers	11 – Rogers	4 – Paopao	Michelob Ultra Arena (3,292); Paradise, NV
March 2, 2023; 2:30 p.m., P12N	(9)	vs. (1) No. 6 Stanford; Quarterfinals	L 65–76	17–14	28 – Paopao	7 – Kyei	3 – Tied	Michelob Ultra Arena (4,245); Paradise, NV
WNIT
March 17, 2023*; 7:00 p.m.		North Dakota State; First round	W 96–57	18–14	24 – Paopao	11 – Rogers	11 – Rogers	Matthew Knight Arena (2,703); Eugene, OR
March 20, 2023*; 6:00 p.m.		Rice; Second round	W 78–53	19–14	19 – Rogers	15 – Kyei	5 – Paopao	Matthew Knight Arena (2,591); Eugene, OR
March 23, 2023*; 6:00 p.m.		San Diego; Super 16	W 81–61	20–14	23 – Hurst	7 – Kyei	10 – Paopao	Matthew Knight Arena (3,009); Eugene, OR
March 26, 2023*; 3:00 p.m.		at Washington; Great 8	L 59–63	20–15	14 – Paopao	11 – Kyei	4 – Paopao	Alaska Airlines Arena (3,052); Seattle, WA
*Non-conference game. ^{#}Rankings from AP Poll. (#) Tournament seedings in parentheses. All times are in Pacific Time.

== Rankings ==
Ranking movements Legend: ██ Increase in ranking ██ Decrease in ranking — = Not ranked RV = Received votes
	Week																				
Poll	Pre	1	2	3	4	5	6	7	8	9	10	11	12	13	14	15	16	17	18	19	Final
AP	20	20*	21	18	19	17	16	16	17	18	21	23	RV	RV	—	—	—	—			Not released
Coaches	20	20*	19^	18	19	17	15	15	16	17	18	21	23	RV	RV	RV	RV	RV			

*The preseason and week 1 polls were the same.
^Coaches did not release a week 2 poll.

== See also ==
- 2022–23 Oregon Ducks men's basketball team
