= 2022–23 Oregon State Beavers women's basketball team =

Intercollegiate basketball season

2022–23 Oregon State Beavers women's basketball
- Conference: Pac-12 Conference
- Record: 13–18 (4–14 Pac-12)
- Head coach: Scott Rueck (13th season)
- Associate head coach: Jonas Chatterton
- Assistant coaches: Jenny Huth; Deven Hunter
- Home arena: Gill Coliseum

2022–23 Pac-12 Conference women's basketball standings
	Conf.				Overall
Team	W		L	PCT	W		L	PCT
No. 8 Utah	15	–	3	.833	27	–	5	.844
No. 5 Stanford	15	–	3	.833	29	–	6	.829
No. 21 Colorado	13	–	5	.722	25	–	9	.735
No. 14 UCLA	11	–	7	.611	27	–	10	.730
No. 25 Arizona	11	–	7	.611	22	–	10	.688
USC	11	–	7	.611	21	–	10	.677
No. 23 Washington State †	9	–	9	.500	23	–	11	.676
Oregon	7	–	11	.389	20	–	15	.571
Washington	7	–	11	.389	19	–	15	.559
California	4	–	14	.222	13	–	17	.433
Oregon State	4	–	14	.222	13	–	18	.419
Arizona State	1	–	17	.056	8	–	20	.286
† 2023 Pac-12 Tournament winner Rankings from AP poll

The 2022–23 Oregon State Beavers women's basketball team represented Oregon State University during the 2022–23 NCAA Division I women's basketball season. The Beavers were led by thirteenth-year head coach Scott Rueck, and they played their games at Gill Coliseum as members of the Pac-12 Conference.

== Previous season ==
The Beavers finished the 2021–22 season 17–14, 6–19 in Pac-12 play to finish in eighth place. As the No. 8 seed in the Pac-12 tournament, they defeated Arizona State in the first round before losing to Stanford in the quarterfinals. They were invited to the WNIT where they defeated Long Beach State in the first round, Portland in the second round and New Mexico in the third round before losing to Pac-12 member UCLA in the quarterfinals.

== Offseason ==
=== Departures ===
Oregon State Departures
Name	Num	Pos.	Height	Year	Hometown	Reason for Departure
Andrea Aquino	2	F	6'9"	(redshirt) Sophomore	Caacupé, Paraguay	Left the team for personal reasons
Taya Corosdale	5	F	6'3"	(redshirt) Junior	Bothell, WA	Graduate transferred to Duke
Greta Kampschroeder	10	F	6'0"	Freshman	Naperville, IL	Transferred to Michigan
Ellie Mack	20	F	6'3"	(redshirt) Senior	Paoli, PA	Graduated
Emily Codding	23	G	6'0"	(redshirt) Senior	Woodstock, GA	Graduated
Tea Adams	25	G	5'9"	(redshirt) Senior	Kirkland, WA	Graduated/signed to play professional with Caledonia Gladiators
Jovana Subasic	41	F	6'4"	(redshirt) Senior	Šabac, Serbia	Graduated
Kennedy Brown	42	F	6'6"	Sophomore	Derby, KS	Transferred to Duke
Taylor Jones	44	F	6'4"	Sophomore	Forney, TX	Transferred to Texas

=== Incoming ===
Oregon State incoming transfers
Name	Num	Pos.	Height	Year	Hometown	Previous School
Shalexxus Aaron	0	G	6'2"	Graduate Student	Apple Valley, CA	Texas Southern
Bendu Yeaney	1	G	5'10"	Graduate Student	Portland, OR	Arizona

==== Recruiting ====
College recruiting information
Name	Hometown	School	Height	Weight	Commit date
Timea Gardiner; F	Plain City, UT	Fremont High School	6 ft 3 in (1.91 m)	N/A	
Timea Gardiner; F	Recruit ratings: ESPN: (98)				
Raegan Beers; P	Littleton, CO	Valor Christian High School	6 ft 2 in (1.88 m)	N/A	
Raegan Beers; P	Recruit ratings: ESPN: (97)				
Overall recruit ranking:
Note: In many cases, Scout, Rivals, 247Sports, On3, and ESPN may conflict in their listings of height and weight.; In these cases, the average was taken. ESPN grades are on a 100-point scale.; Sources: "2022 Player Commits". ESPN. Archived from the original on January 12, 2023.

==== Recruiting class of 2023 ====
College recruiting information (2023)
Name	Hometown	School	Height	Weight	Commit date
Donovyn Hunter; G	Medford, OR	South Medford High School	5 ft 11 in (1.80 m)	N/A	
Donovyn Hunter; G	Recruit ratings: ESPN: (93)				
Overall recruit ranking:
Note: In many cases, Scout, Rivals, 247Sports, On3, and ESPN may conflict in their listings of height and weight.; In these cases, the average was taken. ESPN grades are on a 100-point scale.; Sources: "2023 Player Commits". ESPN. Archived from the original on January 12, 2023.

== Roster ==
2022–23 Oregon State Beavers women's basketball team
Players
Coaches

Pos.	#	Name	Height	Year	Previous school	Hometown
G	0	Shalexxus Aaron	6 ft 1 in (1.85 m)	RS Jr	Martin Luther King; Texas Southern	Apple Valley, CA
G	1	Bendu Yeaney	5 ft 10 in (1.78 m)	RS Sr	St. Mary's; Arizona	Portland, OR
G	2	Lily Hansford	6 ft 2 in (1.88 m)	Fr	Appleton East HS	DePere, WI
G	4	Noelle Mannen	5 ft 6 in (1.68 m)	RS Jr	Valley Catholic HS	North Plains, OR
G	11	AJ Marotte	6 ft 1 in (1.85 m)	So	Vista Ridge HS	Cedar Park, TX
F/C	12	Jelena Mitrović	6 ft 9 in (2.06 m)	RS So		Novi Sad, Serbia
F	15	Raegan Beers	6 ft 4 in (1.93 m)	Fr	Valor Christian HS	Littleton, CO
G	22	Talia von Oelhoffen	5 ft 11 in (1.8 m)	So	Chiawana HS	Pasco, WA
G	24	Adlee Blacklock	6 ft 0 in (1.83 m)	Fr	Lubbock-Cooper HS	Lubbock, TX
F	30	Timea Gardiner	6 ft 3 in (1.91 m)	Fr	Fremont HS	Ogden, UT
G	31	Martha Pietsch	5 ft 5 in (1.65 m)	Fr		Berlin, Germany

Head coach

- Scott Rueck (Oregon State)

Assistant coach(es)

- Jonas Chatterton (Utah)
- Jenny Huth (Colorado)
- Deven Hunter (Oregon State)

Legend

- (C) Team captain
- (S) Suspended
- (I) Ineligible
- (W) Walk-on
- Injured
- Current redshirt

Roster

== Schedule ==
Date time, TV	Rank^{#}	Opponent^{#}	Result	Record	High points	High rebounds	High assists	Site (attendance) city, state
Exhibition
October 30, 2022*; 2:00 p.m.		Western Oregon	W 82–66		–	–	–	Gill Coliseum; Corvallis, OR
Regular season
November 7, 2022*; 5:30 p.m.		Hawaii	W 61–60	1–0	16 – Marotte	7 – Marotte	6 – von Oelhoffen	Gill Coliseum (3,663); Corvallis, OR
November 10, 2022*; 6:00 p.m.		Seattle	W 89–53	2–0	22 – Beers	13 – Mitrovic	5 – Marotte	Gill Coliseum (3,512); Corvallis, OR
November 17, 2022*; 6:00 p.m.		Eastern Washington	W 73–66	3–0	32 – von Oelhoffen	12 – Tied	3 – Tied	Gill Coliseum (3,310); Corvallis, OR
November 19, 2022*; 1:00 p.m.		Prairie View A&M	W 100–59	4–0	28 – Beers	12 – Beers	4 – Tied	Gill Coliseum (3,339); Corvallis, OR
November 25, 2022*; 5:30 p.m., ESPNU		vs. No. 9 Iowa; Phil Knight Legacy semifinals	L 59–73	4–1	22 – von Oelhoffen	14 – Mitrovic	3 – von Oelhoffen	Chiles Center (2,299); Portland, OR
November 25, 2022*; 7:30 p.m., ESPN2		vs. Duke; Phil Knight Legacy consolation game	L 41–54	4–2	11 – Beers	10 – Mitrovic	2 – Marotte	Veterans Memorial Coliseum (2,807); Portland, OR
December 1, 2022*; 11:00 a.m.		Southern	W 89–36	5–2	15 – Tied	14 – Mitrovic	6 – Tied	Gill Coliseum (9,604); Corvallis, OR
December 3, 2022*; 12:00 p.m., P12N		Jackson State	W 63–53	6–2	14 – Pietsch	12 – Beers	6 – Tied	Gill Coliseum (3,429); Corvallis, OR
December 11, 2022; 4:00 p.m., P12N		at No. 17 Oregon; Rivalry	L 67–75	6–3 (0–1)	13 – Mitrovic	11 – Mitrovic	7 – von Oelhoffen	Matthew Knight Arena (6,990); Eugene, OR
December 17, 2022*; 6:00 p.m.		vs. Nevada; Maui Jim Maui Classic	W 96–84	7–3	41 – von Oelhoffen	7 – Yeaney	6 – von Oelhoffen	South Maui Gymnasium; Kihei, HI
December 18, 2022*; 8:00 p.m.		vs. No. 11 LSU; Maui Jim Maui Classic	L 55–87	7–4	14 – von Oelhoffen	9 – Mitrovic	5 – Mannen	South Maui Gymnasium; Kihei, HI
December 27, 2022*; 6:00 p.m.		North Carolina Central	W 89–52	8–4	27 – Beers	12 – von Oelhoffen	5 – Mannen	Gill Coliseum (3,477); Corvallis, OR
December 30, 2022; 6:00 p.m., P12N		USC	L 58–69	8–5 (0–2)	19 – Beers	14 – Beers	3 – Tied	Gill Coliseum (3,769); Corvallis, OR
January 1, 2023; 12:00 p.m., P12N		No. 10 UCLA	W 77–72	9–5 (1–2)	22 – Beers	12 – Beers	8 – Yeaney	Gill Coliseum (3,546); Corvallis, OR
January 6, 2023; 7:00 p.m., P12N		at No. 15 Arizona	L 69–72	9–6 (1–3)	19 – Beers	10 – Tied	5 – Tied	McKale Center (7,182); Tucson, AZ
January 8, 2023; 10:00 a.m., P12N		at Arizona State	W 69–59	10–6 (2–3)	20 – Beers	12 – Beers	4 – Tied	Desert Financial Arena (1,486); Tempe, AZ
January 13, 2023; 7:00 p.m., P12N		Washington State	L 56–63	10–7 (2–4)	11 – Yeaney	12 – Beers	3 – Tied	Gill Coliseum (4,039); Corvallis, OR
January 15, 2023; 12:00 p.m., P12N		Washington	L 67–79	10–8 (2–5)	20 – von Oelhoffen	6 – Beers	5 – Tied	Gill Coliseum (4,122); Corvallis, OR
January 20, 2023; 8:00 p.m., P12N		No. 23 Oregon; Rivalry	W 68–65	11–8 (3–5)	16 – Von Oelhoffen	11 – Mitrovic	5 – Yeaney	Gill Coliseum (5,975); Corvallis, OR
January 27, 2023; 8:00 p.m., P12N		at No. 3 Stanford	L 60–63	11–9 (3–6)	16 – Gardiner	7 – Mitrovic	3 – Tied	Maples Pavilion (3,890); Stanford, CA
January 29, 2023; 1:00 p.m., P12N		at California	L 62–64	11–10 (3–7)	16 – Yeaney	10 – Mitrovic	6 – von Oelhoffen	Haas Pavilion (1,017); Berkeley, CA
February 3, 2023; 6:00 p.m., P12N		No. 7 Utah	L 73–75 ^{OT}	11–11 (3–8)	17 – von Oelhoffen	9 – Tied	5 – Gardiner	Gill Coliseum (4,557); Corvallis, OR
February 5, 2023; 12:00 p.m., P12N		Colorado	L 48–67	11–12 (3–9)	13 – Gardiner	10 – Beers	3 – Tied	Gill Coliseum (4,338); Corvallis, OR
February 10, 2023; 5:00 p.m., P12N		at No. 18 UCLA	L 54–62	11–13 (3–10)	10 – Yeaney	10 – Mitrovic	5 – Yeaney	Pauley Pavilion (2,935); Los Angeles, CA
February 12, 2023; 12:00 p.m., P12N		at USC	L 56–60 ^{OT}	11–14 (3–11)	18 – Beers	16 – Beers	3 – Tied	Galen Center (674); Los Angeles, CA
February 17, 2023; 7:00 p.m., P12N		at Washington	L 59–64	11–15 (3–12)	12 – Tied	13 – Beers	4 – Yeaney	Alaska Airlines Arena (2,192); Seattle, WA
February 19, 2023; 12:00 p.m., P12N		at Washington State	L 57–67	11–16 (3–13)	17 – Gardiner	10 – Beers	3 – Tied	Beasley Coliseum (1,500); Pullman, WA
February 23, 2023; 7:00 p.m., P12N		Arizona State	L 73–75	11–17 (3–14)	14 – Tied	9 – Yeaney	13 – Yeaney	Gill Coliseum (3,711); Corvallis, OR
February 25, 2023; 12:00 p.m., P12N		No. 14 Arizona	W 78–70	12–17 (4–14)	24 – Beers	15 – Mitrovic	9 – Yeaney	Gill Coliseum (4,357); Corvallis, OR
Pac-12 Women's Tournament
March 1, 2023; 8:30 p.m., P12N	(11)	vs. (6) USC; First Round	W 56-48	13-17	18 – Beers	9 – Beers	8 – Yeaney	Michelob Ultra Arena (4,207); Paradise, NV
March 2, 2023; 8:30 p.m., P12N	(11)	vs. (3) No. 20 Colorado; Quarterfinals	L 54-62	13-18	12 – Blacklock	8 – Mitrovic	6 – Yeaney	Michelob Ultra Arena (4,207); Paradise, NV
*Non-conference game. ^{#}Rankings from AP Poll. (#) Tournament seedings in parentheses. All times are in Pacific Time.

== Rankings ==
Ranking movements Legend: ██ Increase in ranking ██ Decrease in ranking — = Not ranked RV = Received votes
	Week																				
Poll	Pre	1	2	3	4	5	6	7	8	9	10	11	12	13	14	15	16	17	18	19	Final
AP	—	—*	—	—	—	—	—	—	—	—	—										Not released
Coaches	—	—*	—^	RV	—	RV	—	—	—	—	—										

*The preseason and week 1 polls were the same.
^Coaches did not release a week 2 poll.

== See also ==
- 2022–23 Oregon State Beavers men's basketball team
