= 2022–23 California Golden Bears women's basketball team =

American basketball team

2022–23 California Golden Bears women's basketball
- Conference: Pac-12 Conference
- Record: 13–17 (4–14 Pac-12)
- Head coach: Charmin Smith (4th season)
- Assistant coaches: Paul Reed; Heidi Heintz; Eliza Pierre
- Home arena: Haas Pavilion

2022–23 Pac-12 Conference women's basketball standings
	Conf.				Overall
Team	W		L	PCT	W		L	PCT
No. 8 Utah	15	–	3	.833	27	–	5	.844
No. 5 Stanford	15	–	3	.833	29	–	6	.829
No. 21 Colorado	13	–	5	.722	25	–	9	.735
No. 14 UCLA	11	–	7	.611	27	–	10	.730
No. 25 Arizona	11	–	7	.611	22	–	10	.688
USC	11	–	7	.611	21	–	10	.677
No. 23 Washington State †	9	–	9	.500	23	–	11	.676
Oregon	7	–	11	.389	20	–	15	.571
Washington	7	–	11	.389	19	–	15	.559
California	4	–	14	.222	13	–	17	.433
Oregon State	4	–	14	.222	13	–	18	.419
Arizona State	1	–	17	.056	8	–	20	.286
† 2023 Pac-12 Tournament winner Rankings from AP poll

The 2022–23 California Golden Bears women's basketball team represented the University of California, Berkeley during the 2022–23 NCAA Division I women's basketball season. The Golden Bears, led by fourth year head coach Charmin Smith, played their home games at Haas Pavilion and competed as members of the Pac-12 Conference.

== Previous season ==
The Golden Bears finished the season 11–13, 2–12 in Pac-12 play to finish in eleventh place. They lost in the first round of the Pac-12 women's tournament to Utah.

== Roster ==
2022–23 California Golden Bears women's basketball team
Players
Coaches

Pos.	#	Name	Height	Year	Previous school	Hometown
F	0	Michelle Onyiah	6 ft 3 in (1.91 m)	Jr	Eleanor Roosevelt	Eastvale, CA
G	1	Leilani McIntosh	5 ft 5 in (1.65 m)	Sr	Xavier College Prep	Phoenix, AZ
G	2	Amaya Bonner	6 ft 0 in (1.83 m)	Fr	Santa Cruz	Fremont, CA
G	4	Karisma Ortiz	6 ft 0 in (1.83 m)	GS	Archbishop Mitty; Texas	San Jose, CA
F	5	Claudia Langarita	6 ft 4 in (1.93 m)	So	INS Joaquim Blume; San Francisco	Barcelona, Spain
F	12	Jadyn Bush	5 ft 11 in (1.8 m)	GS	Bishop Blanchet; Harvard	Federal Way, WA
G	14	Alma Elsnitz	5 ft 11 in (1.8 m)	Jr	Lulea Basketgymnasium	Stockholm, Sweden
G	15	Kemery Martín	6 ft 0 in (1.83 m)	RS So	Corner Canyon	Sandy, UT
G	21	Mia Mastrov	5 ft 11 in (1.8 m)	So	Miramonte	Lafayette, CA
F	24	Evelien Lutje Schipholt	6 ft 2 in (1.88 m)	Sr	Caland Lyceum	The Hague, The Netherlands
G	30	Jayda Curry	5 ft 6 in (1.68 m)	So	Centennial	Corona, CA
G	31	Ornela Muca	5 ft 7 in (1.7 m)	Jr	American Community School of Athens	Athens, Greece
C	32	Sela Heide	6 ft 7 in (2.01 m)	Jr	Mount Si	North Bend, WA
F	33	Sirena Tuitele	6 ft 1 in (1.85 m)	Sr	Pleasant Valley; Colorado	Chico, CA

Head coach

- Charmin Smith (Stanford)

Assistant coach(es)

- Kelly Cole (Northwestern)
- Heidi Heintz (UC Davis)
- Eliza Pierre (California)

Legend

- (C) Team captain
- (S) Suspended
- (I) Ineligible
- (W) Walk-on
- Injured
- Current redshirt

Roster

== Schedule ==
Date time, TV	Rank^{#}	Opponent^{#}	Result	Record	High points	High rebounds	High assists	Site (attendance) city, state
Exhibition
November 3, 2022*; 7:00 p.m.		Vanguard	W 80–58		30 – Curry	10 – Onyiah	6 – Tied	Haas Pavilion; Berkeley, CA
Non-conference regular season
November 7, 2022*; 4:00 p.m.		Cal State Northridge	W 86–56	1–0	18 – Lutje Schipholt	9 – Tuitele	3 – Tied	Haas Pavilion (724); Berkeley, CA
November 12, 2022*; 1:00 p.m., NBC		vs. No. 9 Notre Dame; Citi Shamrock Classic	L 79–90	1–1	24 – Curry	6 – Lutje Schipholt	5 – Tied	Enterprise Center (4,212); St. Louis, MO
November 16, 2022*; 7:00 p.m.		Idaho	W 84–71	2–1	19 – Martín	9 – McIntosh	6 – McIntosh	Haas Pavilion (1,023); Berkeley, CA
November 20, 2022*; 1:00 p.m., WCC Network		at Saint Mary's	W 69–66	3–1	18 – McIntosh	7 – Tuitele	3 – Tied	University Credit Union Pavilion (636); Moraga, CA
November 25, 2022*; 6:30 p.m., WCC Network		at Loyola Marymount; LMU Thanksgiving Classic	W 68–49	4–1	16 – Tied	7 – Lutje Schipholt	3 – Ortiz	Gersten Pavilion (483); Los Angeles, CA
November 26, 2022*; 3:30 p.m.		vs. Montana; LMU Thanksgiving Classic	W 65–44	5–1	18 – Martín	8 – Martín	5 – Ortiz	Gersten Pavilion; Los Angeles, CA
December 3, 2022*; 11:00 a.m.		Arkansas–Pine Bluff; Raising the B.A.R. Invitational	W 84–51	6–1	19 – Curry	10 – Curry	7 – Curry	Haas Pavilion (894); Berkeley, CA
December 4, 2022*; 1:00 p.m.		SMU; Raising the B.A.R. Invitational	L 56–70	6–2	15 – Curry	9 – Lutje Schipholt	7 – Tied	Haas Pavilion (894); Berkeley, CA
December 10, 2022*; 8:00 p.m., P12N		Pacific	W 83–66	7–2	21 – Martín	7 – Tied	5 – Curry	Haas Pavilion (678); Berkeley, CA
December 16, 2022*; 7:00 p.m.		UC San Diego	W 75–61	8–2	22 – Curry	11 – Onyiah	4 – Martín	Haas Pavilion (655); Berkeley, CA
December 18, 2022*; 2:00 p.m., P12N		Florida A&M; Pac-12/SWAC Legacy Series	W 88–58	9–2	19 – Curry	8 – Tuitele	5 – Ortiz	Haas Pavilion (671); Berkeley, CA
Pac-12 regular season
December 23, 2022; 12:00 p.m., P12N		at No. 2 Stanford	L 69–90	9–3 (0–1)	20 – Curry	4 – Tied	4 – Lutje Schipholt	Maples Pavilion (3,970); Stanford, CA
December 31, 2022; 7:00 p.m., P12N		No. 18 Arizona	L 56–63	9–4 (0–2)	13 – Curry	9 – Lutje Schipholt	4 – Curry	Haas Pavilion (605); Berkeley, CA
January 2, 2023; 12:00 p.m., P12N		Arizona State	W 74–61	10–4 (1–2)	16 – Onyiah	11 – Onyiah	8 – McIntosh	Haas Pavilion (842); Berkeley, CA
January 8, 2023; 4:00 p.m., P12N		No. 2 Stanford	L 56–60	10–5 (1–3)	19 – McIntosh	8 – Martin	4 – Martin	Haas Pavilion (3,442); Berkeley, CA
January 13, 2023; 7:00 p.m., P12N		at USC	L 43–63	10–6 (1–4)	14 – Lutje Schipholt	7 – Onyiah	5 – McIntosh	Galen Center (1,031); Los Angeles, CA
January 15, 2023; 12:00 p.m., P12N		at No. 8 UCLA	L 70–87	10–7 (1–5)	23 – Martin	7 – Tuitele	4 – McIntosh	Pauley Pavilion (4,317); Los Angeles, CA
January 20, 2023; 11:30 a.m., P12N		No. 24 Colorado	L 66–73	10–8 (1–6)	17 – Lutje Schipholt	8 – Onyiah	6 – McIntosh	Haas Pavilion (2,394); Berkeley, CA
January 22, 2023; 4:00 p.m., P12N		No. 8 Utah	L 62–87	10–9 (1–7)	15 – Curry	4 – Tied	8 – Curry	Haas Pavilion (1,332); Berkeley, CA
January 27, 2023; 7:00 p.m., P12N		Oregon	L 73–78	11–9 (2–7)	13 – Tied	8 – Onyiah	8 – Curry	Haas Pavilion (1,005); Berkeley, CA
January 29, 2023; 1:00 p.m., P12N		Oregon State	W 64–62	11–10 (2–8)	21 – Curry	7 – Onyiah	7 – McIntosh	Haas Pavilion (1,017); Berkeley, CA
February 3, 2023; 7:00 p.m., P12N		at Washington	L 54–70	11–11 (2–9)	19 – Lutje Schipholt	7 – Lutje Schipholt	4 – Curry	Alaska Airlines Arena (3,496); Seattle, WA
February 5, 2023; 12:00 p.m., P12N		at Washington State	L 60–70	11–12 (2–10)	11 – Martín	9 – Martín	4 – Curry	Beasley Coliseum (1,345); Pullman, WA
February 10, 2023; 6:00 p.m., P12N		at Arizona State	W 72–61	12–12 (3–10)	21 – Curry	7 – Martin	4 – Tied	Desert Financial Arena (2,185); Tempe, AZ
February 12, 2023; 11:00 a.m., P12N		at No. 17 Arizona	L 57–80	12–13 (3–11)	15 – Curry	8 – Onyiah	6 – Curry	McKale Center (7,268); Tucson, AZ
February 17, 2023; 6:00 p.m., P12N		No. 16 UCLA	L 54–67	12–14 (3–12)	15 – Curry	5 – Tied	4 – Tied	Haas Pavilion (1,606); Berkeley, CA
February 19, 2023; 1:00 p.m., P12N		No. 25 USC	W 81–78 ^{OT}	13–14 (4–12)	27 – Curry	9 – Onyiah	5 – McIntosh	Haas Pavilion (1,932); Berkeley, CA
February 23, 2023; 4:00 p.m., P12N		at No. 8 Utah	L 79–101	13–15 (4–13)	28 – Curry	6 – Onyiah	6 – McIntosh	Jon M. Huntsman Center (3,755); Salt Lake City, UT
February 25, 2023; 11:00 a.m., P12N		at No. 21 Colorado	L 69–95	13–16 (4–14)	26 – Curry	6 – Tuitele	6 – Ortiz	CU Events Center (3,452); Boulder, CO
Pac-12 Women's Tournament
March 1, 2023; 6:00 p.m., P12N	(10)	vs. (7) Washington State; First Round	L 49-61	13-17	16 – Curry	8 – Onyiah	3 – Ortiz	Michelob Ultra Arena; Paradise, NV
*Non-conference game. ^{#}Rankings from AP Poll. (#) Tournament seedings in parentheses. All times are in Pacific Time.

== Rankings ==
Ranking movements
	Week																				
Poll	Pre	1	2	3	4	5	6	7	8	9	10	11	12	13	14	15	16	17	18	19	Final
AP		*																			Not released
Coaches		*	^																		

*The preseason and week 1 polls were the same.
^Coaches did not release a week 2 poll.

== See also ==
2022–23 California Golden Bears men's basketball team
