= 2022–23 UCLA Bruins women's basketball team =

American college basketball season

2022–23 UCLA Bruins women's basketball

Battle 4 Atlantis champions

NCAA tournament, Sweet Sixteen
- Conference: Pac-12 Conference

Ranking
- Coaches: No. 13
- AP: No. 14
- Record: 27–10 (11–7 Pac-12)
- Head coach: Cori Close (12th season)
- Associate head coach: Shannon Perry-LeBeauf
- Assistant coaches: Tasha Brown; Tony Newnan
- Home arena: Pauley Pavilion (Capacity: 13,800)

2022–23 Pac-12 Conference women's basketball standings
	Conf.				Overall
Team	W		L	PCT	W		L	PCT
No. 8 Utah	15	–	3	.833	27	–	5	.844
No. 5 Stanford	15	–	3	.833	29	–	6	.829
No. 21 Colorado	13	–	5	.722	25	–	9	.735
No. 14 UCLA	11	–	7	.611	27	–	10	.730
No. 25 Arizona	11	–	7	.611	22	–	10	.688
USC	11	–	7	.611	21	–	10	.677
No. 23 Washington State †	9	–	9	.500	23	–	11	.676
Oregon	7	–	11	.389	20	–	15	.571
Washington	7	–	11	.389	19	–	15	.559
California	4	–	14	.222	13	–	17	.433
Oregon State	4	–	14	.222	13	–	18	.419
Arizona State	1	–	17	.056	8	–	20	.286
† 2023 Pac-12 Tournament winner Rankings from AP poll

The 2022–23 UCLA Bruins women's basketball team represented the University of California, Los Angeles during the 2022–23 NCAA Division I women's basketball season. The Bruins were led by twelfth-year head coach Cori Close. They played their home games at Pauley Pavilion and competed as members of the Pac-12 Conference.

== Previous season ==
The Bruins finished the previous season 18–13, 8–8 in Pac-12 play to finish in seventh place. As the seventh seed in the Pac-12 women's tournament, they defeated their crosstown rivals USC before losing to Oregon in the quarterfinals. The Bruins were invited to the WNIT as the automatic qualifier for the Pac-12 Conference. It was the Bruins' first WNIT appearance since 2015, when they were WNIT champions. They advanced to the tournament's semifinals, where they lost to South Dakota State. The season was impacted by a number of games postponed, cancelled, or forfeited.

== Offseason ==
=== Departures ===
Due to COVID-19 disruptions throughout NCAA sports in 2020–21, the NCAA announced that the 2020–21 season would not count against the athletic eligibility of any individual involved in an NCAA winter sport, including women's basketball. This meant that all seniors in 2020–21 had the option to return for 2021–22.

UCLA Departures
Name	Num.	Pos.	Height	Year	Hometown	Reason for departure
Chantel Horvat	0	G	6'2"	RS Senior	Geelong, Australia	Graduated
Kayla Owens	1	G	6'1"	RS Senior	Houston, TX	Graduated
Kiara Jefferson	3	G	5'9"	Senior	Sacramento, CA	Graduated
Natalie Chou	23	G	6'1"	Graduate Student	Plano, TX	Graduated
IImar'I Thomas	24	F	5'10"	Graduate Student	Oakland, CA	Graduated
Jaelynn Penn	31	G	5'10"	Graduate Student	Louisville, KY	Graduated
Eliana Sigal	51	G	5'10"	Senior	Irvine, CA	Walk-on; graduated

==== Recruiting ====
The 2022 recruiting class was ranked number one in the nation by ESPN.

College recruiting
Name	Hometown	School	Height	Weight	Commit date
Kiki Rice; PG	Washington, DC	Sidwell Friends School	5 ft 11 in (1.80 m)	N/A	
Kiki Rice; PG	Recruit ratings: ESPN: (98)				
Gabriela Jaquez; F	Camarillo, CA	Adolfo Camarillo	6 ft 0 in (1.83 m)	N/A	
Gabriela Jaquez; F	Recruit ratings: ESPN: (96)				
Londynn Jones; PG	Riverside, CA	Santiago High School	5 ft 5 in (1.65 m)	N/A	
Londynn Jones; PG	Recruit ratings: ESPN: (95)				
Christeen Iwuala; P	San Antonio, TX	Ronald Reagan High School	6 ft 3 in (1.91 m)	N/A	
Christeen Iwuala; P	Recruit ratings: ESPN: (94)				
Overall recruit ranking: ESPN: 1
Note: In many cases, Scout, Rivals, 247Sports, On3, and ESPN may conflict in their listings of height and weight.; In these cases, the average was taken. ESPN grades are on a 100-point scale.; Sources: "2022 Player Commits". ESPN. Archived from the original on December 30, 2022.

==== Recruiting class of 2023 ====
College recruiting (2023)
Name	Hometown	School	Height	Weight	Commit date
Amanda Muse; P	Brentwood, CA	Heritage High School	6 ft 4 in (1.93 m)	N/A	
Amanda Muse; P	Recruit ratings: ESPN: (95)				
Overall recruit ranking:
Note: In many cases, Scout, Rivals, 247Sports, On3, and ESPN may conflict in their listings of height and weight.; In these cases, the average was taken. ESPN grades are on a 100-point scale.; Sources: "2023 Player Commits". ESPN. Archived from the original on December 30, 2022.

== Roster ==
2022–23 UCLA Bruins women's basketball team
Players
Coaches

Pos.	#	Name	Height	Year	Previous school	Hometown
G	1	Kiki Rice	5 ft 11 in (1.8 m)	Fr	Sidwell Friends	Bethesda, MD
G	3	Londynn Jones	5 ft 4 in (1.63 m)	Fr	Centennial	Riverside, CA
F	5	Brynn Masikewich	6 ft 3 in (1.91 m)	Sr	Lincoln Prep	Calgary, AB
G	10	Gina Conti	5 ft 11 in (1.8 m)	GS	Grove City High; Wake Forest	Grove City, OH
F	11	Emily Bessoir	6 ft 4 in (1.93 m)	RS So	Wilhelm-Hausenstein Gymnasium	Munich, Germany
G	20	Charisma Osborne	5 ft 9 in (1.75 m)	Sr	Windward School	Moreno Valley, CA
F	21	Lina Sontag	6 ft 3 in (1.91 m)	Fr	Schadow-Gymnasium	Kleinmachnow, Germany
F	22	Christeen Iwuala	6 ft 2 in (1.88 m)	Fr	Ronald Reagan	San Antonio, TX
F	23	Gabriela Jaquez	5 ft 11 in (1.8 m)	Fr	Camarillo	Camarillo, CA
F	32	Angela Dugalić (injured)	6 ft 4 in (1.93 m)	RS So	Maine West; Oregon	Des Plaines, IL
G	35	Camryn Brown	5 ft 11 in (1.8 m)	Sr	Prestonwood Christian	Lewisville, TX
F	43	Izzy Anstey	6 ft 4 in (1.93 m)	RS So	Caulfield	Melbourne, Australia

Head coach

- Cori Close (UC Santa Barbara)

Assistant coach(es)

- Shannon Perry-LeBeauf (Iowa)
- Tony Newnan (UC Santa Barbara)
- Tasha Brown (St. Ambrose)

Legend

- (C) Team captain
- (S) Suspended
- (I) Ineligible
- (W) Walk-on
- Injured
- Current redshirt

Roster

== Schedule ==
Date time, TV	Rank^{#}	Opponent^{#}	Result	Record	High points	High rebounds	High assists	Site (attendance) city, state
Regular Season
November 7, 2022*; 5:30 p.m.		Cal Poly	W 84–48	1–0	20 – Osborne	9 – Tied	7 – Rice	Pauley Pavilion; Los Angeles, CA
November 10, 2022*; 11:30 a.m.		UC Riverside	W 64–43	2–0	16 – Bessoir	13 – Osborne	5 – Rice	Pauley Pavilion (3,918); Los Angeles, CA
November 13, 2022*; 2:00 p.m., P12N		Troy	W 95–83	3–0	29 – Osborne	10 – Osborne	5 – Rice	Pauley Pavilion (2,248); Los Angeles, CA
November 19, 2022*; 11:30 a.m., FloSports		vs. South Dakota State; Battle 4 Atlantis quarterfinals	W 72–65	4–0	28 – Osborne	10 – Brown	5 – Conti	Imperial Arena (235); Nassau, Bahamas
November 20, 2022*; 9:00 a.m., FloSports		vs. No. 11 Tennessee; Battle 4 Atlantis semifinals	W 80–63	5–0	23 – Osborne	7 – Sontag	6 – Rice	Imperial Arena (247); Nassau, Bahamas
November 21, 2022*; 9:00 a.m., ESPN2	No. 20	vs. Marquette; Battle 4 Atlantis championship	W 66–58 ^{OT}	6–0	18 – Rice	9 – Bessoir	6 – Osborne	Imperial Arena (572); Nassau, Bahamas
November 25, 2022*; 2:00 p.m.	No. 20	Jackson State	W 72–60	7–0	20 – Osborne	8 – Sontag	6 – Conti	Pauley Pavilion (2,455); Los Angeles, CA
November 29, 2022*; 4:00 p.m., SECN	No. 15	at No. 1 South Carolina	L 64–73	7–1	24 – Osborne	8 – Bessoir	3 – Conti	Colonial Life Arena (12,501); Columbia, SC
December 3, 2022*; 7:00 p.m., ESPN+	No. 15	at UC Santa Barbara	W 68–57	8–1	19 – Osborne	8 – Rice	4 – Tied	The Thunderdome (2,237); Santa Barbara, CA
December 10, 2022*; 6:00 p.m., P12N	No. 13	Cal State Fullerton	W 64–41	9–1	14 – Rice	9 – Conti	5 – Conti	Pauley Pavilion (2,480); Los Angeles, CA
December 15, 2022; 7:00 p.m., P12N	No. 10	at USC; Rivalry	W 59–56	10–1 (1–0)	16 – Bessoir	13 – Osborne	6 – Conti	Galen Center (3,109); Los Angeles, CA
December 17, 2022*; 2:00 p.m.	No. 10	Cal State Bakersfield	W 75–47	11–1	12 – Tied	8 – Bessoir	8 – Conti	Pauley Pavilion (2,473); Los Angeles, CA
December 20, 2022*; 7:00 p.m., P12N	No. 11	Fresno State	W 82–48	12–1	16 – Osborne	6 – Tied	5 – Conti	Pauley Pavilion (2,163); Los Angeles, CA
December 30, 2022; 6:00 p.m., P12N	No. 10	at No. 17 Oregon	W 82–74	13–1 (2–0)	21 – Rice	6 – Tied	7 – Rice	Matthew Knight Arena (6,726); Eugene, OR
January 1, 2023; 12:00 p.m., P12N	No. 10	at Oregon State	L 72–77	13–2 (2–1)	20 – Rice	7 – Bessoir	6 – Conti	Gill Coliseum (3,546); Corvallis, OR
January 8, 2023; 2:00 p.m., P12N	No. 12	USC; Rivalry	W 61–60	14–2 (3–1)	22 – Jones	7 – Osborne	4 – Osborne	Pauley Pavilion (6,638); Los Angeles, CA
January 13, 2023; 8:00 p.m., P12N	No. 8	No. 2 Stanford	L 59–72	14–3 (3–2)	13 – Tied	7 – Osborne	3 – Tied	Pauley Pavilion (6,855); Los Angeles, CA
January 15, 2023; 12:00 p.m., P12N	No. 8	California	W 87–70	15–3 (4–2)	18 – Jones	8 – Rice	12 – Rice	Pauley Pavilion (4,317); Los Angeles, CA
January 20, 2023; 7:00 p.m., P12N	No. 9	at Washington	W 51–47	16–3 (5–2)	12 – Tied	8 – Sontag	2 – Osborne	Alaska Airlines Arena (2,265); Seattle, WA
January 22, 2023; 12:00 p.m., P12N	No. 9	at Washington State	W 73–66	17–3 (6–2)	13 – Tied	7 – Bessoir	4 – Jones	Beasley Coliseum (986); Pullman, WA
January 27, 2023; 6:00 p.m., P12N	No. 8	at No. 25 Colorado	L 70–73 ^{OT}	17–4 (6–3)	14 – Jones	8 – Brown	5 – Conti	CU Events Center (2,227); Boulder, CO
January 29, 2023; 11:00 a.m., P12N	No. 8	at No. 9 Utah	L 69–71	17–5 (6–4)	17 – Bessoir	6 – Bessoir	5 – Tied	Jon M. Huntsman Center (3,211); Salt Lake City, UT
February 3, 2023; 8:00 p.m., P12N	No. 14	No. 22 Arizona	L 66–71 ^{OT}	17–6 (6–5)	20 – Jones	9 – Rice	5 – Rice	Pauley Pavilion (3,482); Los Angeles, CA
February 5, 2023; 12:00 p.m., P12N	No. 14	Arizona State	W 82–63	18–6 (7–5)	23 – Osborne	7 – Bessoir	8 – Conti	Pauley Pavilion (3,462); Los Angeles, CA
February 10, 2023; 5:00 p.m., P12N	No. 18	Oregon State	W 62–54	19–6 (8–5)	14 – Jaquez	10 – Osborne	4 – Sontag	Pauley Pavilion (2,935); Los Angeles, CA
February 12, 2023; 12:00 p.m., P12N	No. 18	Oregon	W 67–57	20–6 (9–5)	20 – Bessoir	6 – Tied	6 – Osborne	Pauley Pavilion (3,629); Los Angeles, CA
February 17, 2023; 6:00 p.m., P12N	No. 16	at California	W 67–54	21–6 (10–5)	19 – Jones	10 – Osborne	3 – Tied	Haas Pavilion (1,606); Berkeley, CA
February 20, 2023; 6:00 p.m., ESPN2	No. 17	at No. 3 Stanford	L 66–71	21–7 (10–6)	14 – Jones	7 – Osborne	6 – Osborne	Maples Pavilion (5,813); Stanford, CA
February 23, 2023; 6:00 p.m., P12N	No. 17	Washington State	L 55–62	21–8 (10–7)	14 – Osborne	8 – Tied	2 – Tied	Pauley Pavilion (2,825); Los Angeles, CA
February 25, 2023; 12:00 p.m., P12N	No. 17	Washington	W 70–62	22–8 (11–7)	19 – Osborne	6 – Osborne	3 – Jones	Pauley Pavilion (4,375); Los Angeles, CA
Pac-12 Women's Tournament
March 1, 2023; 12:00 p.m., P12N	(5) No. 19	vs. (12) Arizona State; First round	W 81–70 ^{OT}	23–8	17 – Bessoir	9 – Bessoir	6 – Rice	Michelob Ultra Arena (3,292); Paradise, NV
March 2, 2023; 12:00 p.m., P12N	(5) No. 19	vs. (4) No. 21 Arizona; Quarterfinals	W 73–59	24–8	18 – Tied	13 – Bessoir	7 – Rice	Michelob Ultra Arena (4,245); Paradise, NV
March 3, 2023; 6:00 p.m., P12N	(5) No. 19	vs. (1) No. 6 Stanford; Semifinals	W 69–65	25–8	22 – Rice	6 – Bessoir	5 – Rice	Michelob Ultra Arena; Paradise, NV
March 5, 2023; 2:00 p.m., ESPN2	(5) No. 19	vs. (7) Washington State; Final	L 61–65	25–9	19 – Osborne	5 – Tied	3 – Tied	Michelob Ultra Arena (5,032); Paradise, NV
NCAA tournament
March 18, 2023*; 8:30 p.m., ESPN2	(4 G1) No. 14	(13 G1) Sacramento State; First Round	W 67–45	26–9	15 – Rice	12 – Osborne	5 – Osborne	Pauley Pavilion; Los Angeles, CA
March 20, 2023*; 7:00 p.m., ESPN2	(4 G1) No. 14	(5 G1) No. 16 Oklahoma; Second Round	W 82–73	27–9	36 – Osborne	8 – Osborne	5 – Conti	Pauley Pavilion (3,872); Los Angeles, CA
March 25, 2023*; 11:00 a.m., ESPN	(4 G1) No. 14	vs. (1 G1) No. 1 South Carolina; Sweet Sixteen	L 43–59	27–10	14 – Osborne	7 – Osborne	2 – Osborne	Bon Secours Wellness Arena; Greenville, SC
*Non-conference game. ^{#}Rankings from AP Poll. (#) Tournament seedings in parentheses. G1=Greenville 1. All times are in Pacific Time.

== Rankings ==
Ranking movements Legend: ██ Increase in ranking ██ Decrease in ranking RV = Received votes
	Week																				
Poll	Pre	1	2	3	4	5	6	7	8	9	10	11	12	13	14	15	16	17	18	19	Final
AP	RV	RV*	RV	20	15	13	10	11	10	12	8	9	8	14	18	16	17	19	17	14	Not released
Coaches	RV	RV*	RV^	21	17	15	14	14	13	15	14	13	13	16	17	16	16	16	17	15	13

*The preseason and week 1 polls were the same.
^Coaches did not release a week 2 poll.

== Awards and honors ==
- February 20 – Londynn Jones named the Pac-12 Freshman of the Week

=== All Pac-12 Conference honors ===
- Charisma Osborne (All Pac-12)
- Londynn Jones (All Freshman Team)
- Kiki Rice (All Freshman Team)

=== Pac-12 All-Tournament team ===
- Emily Bessoir (11 pts, 5 reb, 3 ast)
- Charisma Osborne (19 pts, 6-7 FT, 3 ast)
- Kiki Rice (13 pts, 3 reb)
