= 2022–23 USC Trojans women's basketball team =

Intercollegiate basketball season

2022–1923 USC Trojans women's basketball

NCAA tournament, First Round
- Conference: Pac-12 Conference
- Record: 21–10 (11–7 Pac-12)
- Head coach: Lindsay Gottlieb (2nd season)
- Assistant coaches: Beth Burns (1st season); Wendale Farrow (2nd season); Nneka Enemkpali (2nd season)
- Home arena: Galen Center

2022–23 Pac-12 Conference women's basketball standings
	Conf.				Overall
Team	W		L	PCT	W		L	PCT
No. 8 Utah	15	–	3	.833	27	–	5	.844
No. 5 Stanford	15	–	3	.833	29	–	6	.829
No. 21 Colorado	13	–	5	.722	25	–	9	.735
No. 14 UCLA	11	–	7	.611	27	–	10	.730
No. 25 Arizona	11	–	7	.611	22	–	10	.688
USC	11	–	7	.611	21	–	10	.677
No. 23 Washington State †	9	–	9	.500	23	–	11	.676
Oregon	7	–	11	.389	20	–	15	.571
Washington	7	–	11	.389	19	–	15	.559
California	4	–	14	.222	13	–	17	.433
Oregon State	4	–	14	.222	13	–	18	.419
Arizona State	1	–	17	.056	8	–	20	.286
† 2023 Pac-12 Tournament winner Rankings from AP poll

The 2022–23 USC Trojans women's basketball team represented the University of Southern California during the 2022–23 NCAA Division I women's basketball season. The Trojans played their home games at the Galen Center and were members of the Pac-12 Conference. The squad was led by second-year head coach Lindsay Gottlieb, who was hired on May 10, 2021.

The Trojans finished the regular Pac-12 season tied for 4th place with UCLA and Arizona. Because both of those teams held tiebreakers over USC, the Trojans earned the 6th seed in the 2023 Pac-12 Conference women's basketball tournament.

== Previous season ==
The 2021–22 USC Trojans women's basketball team finished with an overall record of 12–16 and a 5–12 conference record. They earned the 10th seed in the 2022 Pac-12 Conference women's basketball tournament.

== Offseason changes ==
Assistant Coach Danyelle Grant moved to serve as an assistant coach at Rice. In her place, Gottlieb hired Beth Burns from Louisville as associate head coach.

As for players, the Women of Troy brought in one first-year and seven transfers. Three students graduated, and six transferred to other schools.

=== Departures ===
Name	Number	Pos.	Height	Year	Hometown	Reason for departure
Tera Reed	3	G	6'0"	Graduate student	Auckland, NZ	Graduated
Jordan Sanders	5	F	5'11"	Graduate student	Springfield, MO	Graduated
Amaya Oliver	10	G/F	6'2"	Sophomore	Richmond, CA	Transferred to Loyola Marymount
Shemera Williams	11	G	6'2"	Junior	Milwaukee, WI	Transferred to SIU Salukis
Angel Jackson	15	C	6'5"	Junior	Richmond, CA	Transferred to Jackson State
Kyra White	22	G	5'10"	Junior	Converse, TX	Transferred to UT San Antonio
Desiree Caldwell	24	G	5'8"	Senior	San Antonio, TX	Graduated
Jordyn Jenkins	32	F	6'2"	Sophomore	Kent, WA	Transferred to UT San Antonio
Alissa Pili	10	F	6'0"	Junior	Anchorage, AK	Transferred to Utah

=== Incoming transfers ===
Name	Num	Pos.	Height	Year	Hometown	Previous school
Koi Love	0	F	6'0"	Junior	Orlando, FL	Arizona
Taylor Bigby	1	G	6'1"	Sophomore	Las Vegas, NV	Oregon
Kayla Williams	4	G	5'7"	Junior	Los Angeles, CA	UC Irvine
Destiny Littleton	11	G	5'9"	Graduate student	San Diego, CA	South Carolina
Okako Adika	24	G/F	6'0"	Graduate student	Holstebro, DK	Texas Christian
Kadi Sissoko	30	F	6'2"	Graduate student	Paris, FR	Minnesota
Rokia Doumbia	52	G	5'9"	Graduate student	Bamako, ML	Purdue

=== 2022 recruiting class ===
Name	Overall rank	Position	Position rank	Hometown	High school	Height	ESPN stars	ESPN grade
Aaliyah Gayles	8	G	3	Las Vegas, NV	Spring Valley High School	5'9"	5	97

Gayles sat out this whole season as she recovered from her injuries that resulted from gun violence in April 2022. Since then, she relearned how to walk and received support via coaching, physical therapy, and counseling.

== Roster ==
2022–23 USC Trojans women's basketball team
Players
Coaches

Pos.	#	Name	Height	Year	Previous school	Hometown
F	0	Koi Love	6 ft 0 in (1.83 m)	Jr	Arizona	Orlando, FL
G	1	Taylor Bigby	6 ft 1 in (1.85 m)	So	Oregon	Las Vegas, NV
G	2	India Otto (W)	5 ft 9 in (1.75 m)	Sr	Windward HS	Los Angeles, CA
G	3	Aaliyah Gayles (injured)	5 ft 9 in (1.75 m)	Fr	Spring Valley HS	Las Vegas, NV
G	4	Kayla Williams	5 ft 7 in (1.7 m)	Jr	UC Irvine	Los Angeles, CA
G	11	Destiny Littleton	5 ft 9 in (1.75 m)	GS	South Carolina	San Diego, CA
G	12	Isabella Perkins	5 ft 9 in (1.75 m)	So	Paul VI HS	Chantilly, VA
G/F	13	Rayah Marshall	6 ft 4 in (1.93 m)	So	Lynwood HS	Los Angeles, CA
G	23	Madison Campbell	5 ft 11 in (1.8 m)	RS Jr	Clovis West HS	Fresno, CA
G/F	24	Okako Adika	6 ft 0 in (1.83 m)	GS	Texas Christian	Holstebro, DK
G	25	Alyson Miura	5 ft 9 in (1.75 m)	Sr	La Salle Prep	Clackamas, OR
F	30	Kadi Sissoko	6 ft 2 in (1.88 m)	GS	Minnesota	Paris, FR
C	32	Clarice Akunwafo	6 ft 6 in (1.98 m)	So	Rolling Hills Prep	Inglewood, CA
G	52	Rokia Doumbia	5 ft 9 in (1.75 m)	GS	Purdue	Bamako, ML

Head coach

- Lindsay Gottlieb (Brown)

Assistant coach(es)

- Beth Burns (Ohio Wesleyan)
- Wendale Farrow (Eastern Michigan)
- Nneka Enemkpali (Texas)

Legend

- (C) Team captain
- (S) Suspended
- (I) Ineligible
- (W) Walk-on
- Injured
- Current redshirt

Roster
Last update: November 9, 2022

=== Awards and honors ===
- Gottlieb
  - ESPN Coach of the Week
- Adika
  - Pac-12 All-Defensive Team Honorable Mention
- Littleton
  - Pac-12 Women's Basketball Player of the Week
  - NCAA March Madness Weekly Starting Five
  - College Sports Communicators All-District Academic Honors
  - All-Pac-12
- Marshall
  - Preseason All-Pac-12 Honorable Mention
  - Pac-12 Women's Basketball Player of the Week Award
  - NCAA March Madness Weekly Starting Five
  - Naismith Defensive Player of the Year Watch List
  - Naismith Defensive Player of the Year Semifinalist
  - All-Pac-12
  - Pac-12 All-Defensive Team
- Miura
  - College Sports Communicators All-District Academic Honors
- Sissoko
  - All-Pac-12
- Williams
  - Pac-12 All-Defensive Team Honorable Mention
- Team
  - ESPN Win of the Week
  - USBWA National Team of the Week

== Schedule ==
Date time, TV	Rank^{#}	Opponent^{#}	Result	Record	High points	High rebounds	High assists	Site city, state
Exhibition
October 30, 2022*; 3:00 pm		Cal State Los Angeles	W 87–48		25 – Sissoko	15 – Marshall	8 – Williams	Galen Center (224); Los Angeles, CA
Regular season
November 9, 2022*; 7:00 pm		Cal State Bakersfield	W 86–41	1–0	15 – Tie	10 – Marshall	6 – Williams	Galen Center (818); Los Angeles, CA
November 12, 2022*; 7:00 pm		Idaho State	W 75–42	2–0	19 – Littleton	6 – Tie	6 – Tie	Galen Center (561); Los Angeles, CA
November 15, 2022*; 6:00 pm, WCC Network		at San Diego	W 58–50	3–0	19 – Sissoko	9 – Marshall	4 – Littleton	Jenny Craig Pavilion (567); San Diego, CA
November 19, 2022*; 2:00 pm		at San Francisco	W 74–48	4–0	21 – Sissoko	10 – Marshall	3 – Littleton	War Memorial Gymnasium; San Francisco, CA
November 23, 2022*; 2:00 pm		Penn	W 66–60	5–0	19 – Marshall	18 – Marshall	5 – Littleton	Galen Center (689); Los Angeles, CA
November 26, 2022*; 1:00 pm		Utah State	W 79–48	6–0	20 – Sissoko	7 – Marshall	7 – Williams	Galen Center (316); Los Angeles, CA
November 30, 2022*; 7:00 pm		Cal Baptist	W 69–58	7–0	16 – Littleton	14 – Littleton	4 – Tie	Galen Center (228); Los Angeles, CA
December 3, 2022*; 7:00 pm		Merrimack	W 88–40	8–0	21 – Bigby	10 – Adika	7 – Williams	Galen Center (258); Los Angeles, CA
December 6, 2022*; 7:00 pm		San Jose State	W 71–44	9–0	17 – Sissoko	8 – Akunwafo	5 – Miura	Galen Center (258); Los Angeles, CA
December 15, 2022; 7:00 pm, P12N		No. 10 UCLA; Rivalry	L 56–59	9–1 (0–1)	20 – Sissoko	10 – Marshall	7 – Littleton	Galen Center (3,109); Los Angeles, CA
December 18, 2022*; 12:30 pm, ESPN2		vs. Texas; Pac-12 Coast-to-Coast Challenge	L 48–62	9–2	12 – Tie	18 – Marshall	6 – Littleton	American Airlines Center (4,700); Dallas, TX
December 21, 2022*; 2:00 pm		Saint Mary's	W 71–45	10–2	18 – Marshall	15 – Marshall	5 – Tie	Galen Center (304); Los Angeles, CA
December 30, 2022; 6:00 pm, P12N		at Oregon State	W 69–58	11–2 (1–1)	33 – Marshall	16 – Marshall	6 – Littleton	Gill Coliseum (3,769); Corvallis, OR
January 1, 2023; 2:00 pm, P12N		at No. 17 Oregon	L 45–73	11–3 (1–2)	14 – Marshall	11 – Marshall	2 – Tie	Matthew Knight Arena (6,031); Eugene, OR
January 8, 2023; 2:00 pm, P12N		at No. 12 UCLA; Rivalry	L 60–61	11–4 (1–3)	15 – Tie	8 – Marshall	3 – Littleton	Pauley Pavilion (6,638); Los Angeles, CA
January 13, 2023; 7:00 pm, P12N		California	W 63–43	12–4 (2–3)	18 – Littleton	11 – Marshall	5 – Littleton	Galen Center (1,031); Los Angeles, CA
January 15, 2023; 2:00 pm, P12N		No. 2 Stanford	W 55–46	13–4 (3–3)	18 – Littleton	11 – Adika	6 – Littleton	Galen Center (2,418); Los Angeles, CA
January 20, 2023; 7:00 pm, P12N		at Washington State	W 51–44	14–4 (4–3)	19 – Sissoko	9 – Marshall	2 – Tie	Beasley Coliseum (926); Pullman, WA
January 22, 2023; 12:00 pm, P12N		at Washington	W 63–54 ^{OT}	15–4 (5–3)	20 – Littleton	16 – Marshall	3 – Sissoko	Alaska Airlines Arena (2,543); Seattle, WA
January 27, 2023; 6:00 pm, P12N		at No. 9 Utah	L 73–83	15–5 (5–4)	15 – Tie	11 – Marshall	5 – Sissoko	Jon M. Huntsman Center (3,251); Salt Lake City, UT
January 29, 2023; 11:00 am, P12N		at No. 25 Colorado	W 71–54	16–5 (6–4)	21 – Littleton	12 – Sissoko	5 – Sissoko	CU Events Center (2,377); Boulder, CO
February 3, 2023; 7:00 pm, P12N		Arizona State	W 64–49	17–5 (7–4)	23 – Sissoko	21 – Marshall	4 – Marshall	Galen Center (801); Los Angeles, CA
February 5, 2023; 12:00 pm, P12N		No. 22 Arizona	L 75–81 ^{2OT}	17–6 (7–5)	21 – Littleton	20 – Marshall	5 – Littleton	Galen Center (1,356); Los Angeles, CA
February 10, 2023; 7:00 pm, P12N		Oregon	W 56–51	18–6 (8–5)	18 – Tie	11 – Tie	4 – Littleton	Galen Center (1,126); Los Angeles, CA
February 12, 2023; 12:00 pm, P12N		Oregon State	W 60–56 ^{OT}	19–6 (9–5)	18 – Littleton	14 – Marshall	3 – Tie	Galen Center (674); Los Angeles, CA
February 17, 2023; 8:00 pm, P12N	No. 25	at No. 3 Stanford	L 47–50	19–7 (9–6)	15 – Littleton	12 – Akunwafo	3 – Tie	Maples Pavilion (6,343); Stanford, CA
February 19, 2023; 1:00 pm, P12N	No. 25	at California	L 78–81 ^{OT}	19–8 (9–7)	30 – Sissoko	9 – Marshall	4 – Sissoko	Haas Pavilion (1,932); Berkeley, CA
February 23, 2023; 8:00 pm, P12N		Washington	W 47–43	20–8 (10–7)	19 – Sissoko	10 – Marshall	5 – Littleton	Galen Center (842); Los Angeles, CA
February 25, 2023; 12:00 pm, P12N		Washington State	W 68–65 ^{2OT}	21–8 (11–7)	19 – Sissoko	13 – Sissoko	3 – Tie	Galen Center (2,832); Los Angeles, CA
Pac-12 tournament
March 1, 2023; 8:30 pm, P12N	(6)	vs. (11) Oregon State; First Round	L 48–56	21–9	17 – Sissoko	11 – Marshall	5 – Littleton	Michelob Ultra Arena (3,329); Paradise, NV
NCAA tournament
March 17, 2023; 5:00 pm, ESPNEWS	(8 S3)	vs. (9 S3) South Dakota State; First Round	L 57–62 ^{OT}	21–10	17 – Marshall	13 – Marshall	4 – Littleton	Cassell Coliseum (8,925); Blacksburg, VA
*Non-conference game. ^{#}Rankings from AP Poll. (#) Tournament seedings in parentheses. S3=Seattle 3. All times are in Pacific Time.

Source: USCTrojans.com

== Rankings ==
Ranking movements Legend: ██ Increase in ranking ██ Decrease in ranking — = Not ranked RV = Received votes
	Week																				
Poll	Pre	1	2	3	4	5	6	7	8	9	10	11	12	13	14	15	16	17	18	19	Final
AP	—	—	—	—	—	RV	RV	RV	RV	—	—	RV	RV	RV	RV	25	RV	RV	RV	RV	Not released
Coaches	—	—	—	—	—	—	—	—	—	—	—	RV	RV	RV	RV	RV	RV	RV	RV	—	—
