= 2023 Pac-12 women's basketball tournament =

American collegiate postseason women's basketball tournament

2023 Pac-12 Conference women's basketball tournament
- Classification: Division I
- Season: 2022–23
- Teams: 12
- Site: Michelob Ultra Arena; Las Vegas, NV
- Champions: Washington State (1st title)
- Winning coach: Kamie Ethridge (1st title)
- MVP: Charlisse Leger-Walker (Washington State)
- Attendance: 25,176
- Television: Pac-12 Network, ESPN2

2022–23 Pac-12 Conference women's basketball standings
	Conf.				Overall
Team	W		L	PCT	W		L	PCT
No. 8 Utah	15	–	3	.833	27	–	5	.844
No. 5 Stanford	15	–	3	.833	29	–	6	.829
No. 21 Colorado	13	–	5	.722	25	–	9	.735
No. 14 UCLA	11	–	7	.611	27	–	10	.730
No. 25 Arizona	11	–	7	.611	22	–	10	.688
USC	11	–	7	.611	21	–	10	.677
No. 23 Washington State †	9	–	9	.500	23	–	11	.676
Oregon	7	–	11	.389	20	–	15	.571
Washington	7	–	11	.389	19	–	15	.559
California	4	–	14	.222	13	–	17	.433
Oregon State	4	–	14	.222	13	–	18	.419
Arizona State	1	–	17	.056	8	–	20	.286
† 2023 Pac-12 Tournament winner Rankings from AP poll

The 2023 Pac-12 Conference women's basketball tournament, presented by New York Life, was a postseason tournament held from March 1–5, 2023, at Michelob Ultra Arena on the Las Vegas Strip in Paradise, Nevada.

Washington State, seeded seventh out of the conference's 12 teams, won the tournament and with it the Pac-12 Conference's automatic bid to the NCAA Division I women's tournament. ESPN journalist Alexa Philippou called Washington State's title run "one of the more improbable Power 5 conference tournament runs in recent memory." The championship game was the first in the tournament's history not to feature any of the top four seeds, and the Cougars were the lowest-seeded team ever to reach the title game, and the first to win it. This was the first Pac-12 title for Washington State in any women's sport, and the first Pac-12 tournament championship in any sport for the Cougars since 2002.

== Seeds ==
Seed	School	Conf.	Over.	Tiebreak 1	Tiebreak 2
#1	Stanford	15–3	27–4	2–0 Vs. Colorado	−
#2	Utah	15–3	25–3	1–1 Vs. Colorado	−
#3	Colorado	13–5	22–7	−	−
#4	Arizona	11–7	21–8	2–0 Vs. UCLA & USC	−
#5	UCLA	11–7	22–8	2–1 Vs. Arizona & USC	2–0 Vs. USC
#6	USC	11–7	21–8	0–3 Vs. Arizona & UCLA	0–2 Vs. UCLA
#7	Washington State	9–9	19–10	−	−
#8	Washington	7–11	15–13	1–1 Vs. Oregon	1–2 Vs. Stanford & Utah
#9	Oregon	7–11	16–13	1–1 Vs. Oregon	0–3 Vs. Stanford & Utah
#10	California	4–14	13–16	1–0 Vs. Oregon State	−
#11	Oregon State	4–14	12–17	0–1 Vs. California	−
#12	Arizona State	1–17	8–19	−	−

== Schedule ==
Session	Game	Time	Matchup	Television	Attendance
First Round – Wednesday, March 1
1	1	12:00 pm	#5 UCLA 81 vs. #12 Arizona State 70 ^{OT}	P12N	3,292
1	2	2:30 pm	#8 Washington 50 vs. #9 Oregon 52	P12N	3,292
2	3	6:00 pm	#7 Washington State 61 vs. #10 California 49	P12N	3,329
2	4	8:30 pm	#6 USC 48 vs. #11 Oregon State 56	P12N	3,329
Quarterfinals – Thursday, March 2
3	5	12:00 pm	#4 Arizona 59 vs. #5 UCLA 73	P12N	4,245
3	6	2:30 pm	#1 Stanford 76 vs. #9 Oregon 65	P12N	4,245
4	7	6:00 pm	#2 Utah 58 vs. #7 Washington State 66	P12N	4,207
4	8	8:30 pm	#3 Colorado 62 vs. #11 Oregon State 54	P12N	4,207
Semifinals – Friday, March 3
5	9	6:00 pm	#5 UCLA 69 vs. #1 Stanford 65	P12N	5,071
5	10	8:30 pm	#7 Washington State 61 vs. #3 Colorado 49	P12N	5,071
Championship Game – Sunday, March 5
6	11	2:00 pm	#5 UCLA 61 vs. #7 Washington State 65	ESPN2	5,032
Game times in PT. Rankings denote tournament seeds.

== Bracket ==
First round Wednesday, March 1 P12N
5	#19 UCLA	81*
12	Arizona State	70
8	Washington	50
9	Oregon	52
7	Washington State	61
10	California	49
6	USC	48
11	Oregon State	56

Quarterfinals; Thursday, March 2 P12N
4	#21 Arizona	59
5	#19 UCLA	73
1	#6 Stanford	76
9	Oregon	65
2	#3 Utah	58
7	Washington State	66
3	#20 Colorado	62
11	Oregon State	54

Semifinals; Friday, March 3 P12N
5	#19 UCLA	69
1	#6 Stanford	65
7	Washington State	61
3	#20 Colorado	49

Championship Game; Sunday, March 5 ESPN2
5	#19 UCLA	61
7	Washington State	65

Note: * denotes overtime

=== Pac-12 All-Tournament team ===
- MVP: Charlisse Leger-Walker, Washington State
- Bella Murekatete, Washington State
- Cameron Brink, Stanford
- Emily Bessoir, UCLA
- Charisma Osborne, UCLA
- Kiki Rice, UCLA

=== Hall of Honor ===
The 2023 class of the Pac-12 Hall of Honor was honored on March 3 during the 2023 Women's Tournament during a ceremony prior to the tournament semifinals. The 2023 class was the first ever all-female class inducted into the Hall of Honor in recognition of the 50th anniversary of the passage of Title IX. The class includes:

- Susie Parra (Arizona Softball)
- Jackie Johnson-Powell (Arizona State Women's Track & Field)
- Dr. Luella Lilly (California Athletic Director)
- Ceal Barry (Colorado Women's Basketball Coach & Administrator)
- Janie Takeda Reed (Oregon Softball)
- Dr. Mary Budke (Oregon State Women's Golf)
- Jessica Mendoza (Stanford Softball)
- Natalie Williams (UCLA Women's Basketball & Volleyball)
- Barbara Hallquist DeGroot (USC Women's Tennis)
- Kim Gaucher (Utah Women's Basketball)
- Danielle Lawrie (Washington Softball)
- Sarah Silvernail (Washington State Women's Volleyball)

== See also ==
- 2023 Pac-12 Conference men's basketball tournament
