= Lina Sontag =

German basketball player

- Lina Sontag in Lina Sontag

Personal information
- Born: 24 November 2003 (age 22)
- Listed height: 1.91 m (6 ft 3 in)

Career information
- College: UCLA
- Position: Forward

Lina Sontag (born 24 November 2003) is a German basketball player. She represented Germany at the 2024 Summer Olympics. She played for UCLA Bruins women's basketball in the United States for the 2022-23 and 2023-24 seasons.

== High School / Gymnasium ==
Sontag attended Schadow-Gymnasium Berlin for high school. She played for Tus Lichterfelde (TuSLIi) sports club in Berlin where she won three youth team German championships. She was the MVP for the Weibliche Nachwuchs-Basketball-Bundesliga (Girls' Junior Basketball Bundesliga, abbreviated WNBL) for the 2019-2020 season.

== U.S. College ==
Sontag attended UCLA, where she was a member of the 2022–23 UCLA Bruins women's basketball team and the 2023–24 UCLA Bruins women's basketball team. Both teams made appearances in the NCAA basketball tournament and reached the Sweet Sixteen.

== German national team ==
Sontag played for Germany in the 2022 FIBA U20 Women’s European Championship. She was on the German Senior National Team for the 2021 FIBA Women’s EuroBasket Qualifiers. She was a member of the German Youth National Team at the FIBA U16 Women’s European Championship in 2018 and 2019.

== Professional ==
Sontag played for Eisvögel USC Freiburg where she was part of the 2021-22 DBBL championship squad and was voted league Rookie of the Year.

== Career statistics ==
Legend
GP	Games played	GS	Games started	MPG	Minutes per game	RPG	Rebounds per game
APG	Assists per game	SPG	Steals per game	BPG	Blocks per game	PPG	Points per game
TO	Turnovers per game	FG%	Field-goal percentage	3P%	3-point field-goal percentage	FT%	Free-throw percentage
**Bold**	Career best	°	League leader

=== College ===
Year	Team	GP	GS	MPG	FG%	3P%	FT%	RPG	APG	SPG	BPG	TO	PPG
2022–23	UCLA	**35**	**7**	**17.2**	**41.2**	**25.9**	61.1	**4.1**	0.8	**1.1'**	**1.1**	1.7	**4.9**
2023–24	UCLA	24	4	14.4	36.0	20.8	**75.0**	2.0	**1.3**	0.8	0.8	**0.9**	2.0
**Career**		59	11	16.1	40.1	24.4	65.4	3.2	1.0	1.0	0.9	1.3	3.7
Statistics retrieved from Sports-Reference.
