= 2022–23 Arizona State Sun Devils women's basketball team =

American college basketball season

2022–23 Arizona State Sun Devils women's basketball
- Conference: Pac-12 Conference
- Record: 8–20 (1–17 Pac-12)
- Head coach: Natasha Adair (1st season)
- Assistant coaches: Darrell Mosley; Mykala Walker; Camille Collier
- Home arena: Desert Financial Arena

2022–23 Pac-12 Conference women's basketball standings
| | Conf. | | | | Overall |
| Team | W | | L | PCT | W | | L | PCT |
|---|---|---|---|---|---|---|---|---|
| No. 8 Utah | 15 | – | 3 | .833 | 27 | – | 5 | .844 |
| No. 5 Stanford | 15 | – | 3 | .833 | 29 | – | 6 | .829 |
| No. 21 Colorado | 13 | – | 5 | .722 | 25 | – | 9 | .735 |
| No. 14 UCLA | 11 | – | 7 | .611 | 27 | – | 10 | .730 |
| No. 25 Arizona | 11 | – | 7 | .611 | 22 | – | 10 | .688 |
| USC | 11 | – | 7 | .611 | 21 | – | 10 | .677 |
| No. 23 Washington State † | 9 | – | 9 | .500 | 23 | – | 11 | .676 |
| Oregon | 7 | – | 11 | .389 | 20 | – | 15 | .571 |
| Washington | 7 | – | 11 | .389 | 19 | – | 15 | .559 |
| California | 4 | – | 14 | .222 | 13 | – | 17 | .433 |
| Oregon State | 4 | – | 14 | .222 | 13 | – | 18 | .419 |
| Arizona State | 1 | – | 17 | .056 | 8 | – | 20 | .286 |
† 2023 Pac-12 Tournament winner Rankings from AP poll

The 2022–23 Arizona State women's basketball team represented Arizona State University during the 2022–23 NCAA Division I women's basketball season. The Sun Devils are led by first-year head coach Natasha Adair and they play their home games at the Desert Financial Arena and compete as members of the Pac-12 Conference.

== Previous season ==
The Sun Devils finished the season 12–14, 4–9 in Pac-12 play to finish in ninth place. They lost in the first round of the Pac-12 women's tournament to Oregon. On March 3, 2022 Charli Turner Thorne announce her retirement after 25 seasons at Arizona State and 28 seasons as a head coach. She would finish with a 28 year record of 528–334.

== Offseason ==
=== Departures ===
Due to COVID-19 disruptions throughout NCAA sports in 2020–21, the NCAA announced that the 2020–21 season would not count against the athletic eligibility of any individual involved in an NCAA winter sport, including women's basketball. This meant that all seniors in 2020–21 had the option to return for 2021–22.

Arizona State Departures
| Name | Num | Pos. | Height | Year | Hometown | Reason for Departure |
|---|---|---|---|---|---|---|
| Taya Hanson | 0 | G | 5'10" | Senior | Kelowna, BC | Graduate transferred to Oregon |
| Gabriela Bosquez | 3 | G | 5'7" | Junior | Kyle, TX | Transferred to BYU |
| Ayzhiana Basallo | 5 | G | 5'5" | Senior | San Francisco, CA | Graduate transferred to Santa Clara |
| Mael Gillies | 12 | G | 6'1" | GS Senior | Montreal, QC | Graduated |
| Katelyn Levings | 20 | F | 6'3" | Sophomore | Oklahoma City, OK | Transferred to Tulsa |
| Jade Loville | 30 | G/F | 5'11" | Senior | Scottsdale, AZ | Graduate transferred to Arizona |
| Jayde Van Hyfte | 32 | F | 6'1" | Senior | Annawan, IL | Graduated |

=== Incoming ===
Arizona State incoming transfers
| Name | Num | Pos. | Height | Year | Hometown | Previous School |
|---|---|---|---|---|---|---|
| Tyi Skinner | 3 | G | 5'5" | Junior | Washington, D.C. | Delaware |
| Treasure Hunt | 12 | G | 6'1" | Junior | Chattanooga, TN | Kentucky |
| Kayla Mokwuah | 24 | C | 6'4" | GS Senior | Longmeadow, MA | TCU |
| Morasha Wiggins | 30 | F | 6'0" | Sophomore | Kalamazoo, MI | North Carolina |

==== Recruiting ====
College recruiting information
| Name | Hometown | School | Height | Weight | Commit date |
|---|---|---|---|---|---|
| Tryanna Crisp; G | Phoenix, AZ | PHH Prep | 5 ft 8 in (1.73 m) | N/A | |
| Tryanna Crisp; G | Recruit ratings: ESPN: (92) | | | | |
Overall recruit ranking:
Note: In many cases, Scout, Rivals, 247Sports, On3, and ESPN may conflict in their listings of height and weight.; In these cases, the average was taken. ESPN grades are on a 100-point scale.; Sources: "2022 Player Commits". ESPN. Archived from the original on January 23, 2023.

== Roster ==
2022–23 Arizona State Sun Devils women's basketball team
Players
Coaches

| Pos. | # | Name | Height | Year | Previous school | Hometown |
|---|---|---|---|---|---|---|
| G | 0 | Jaylah Robinson | 5 ft 11 in (1.8 m) | Fr | Mastery Charter School | Philadelphia, PA |
| G | 2 | Jaddan Simmons | 5 ft 9 in (1.75 m) | Jr | Green Bay Southwest HS | Green Bay, WI |
| G | 3 | Tyi Skinner | 5 ft 5 in (1.65 m) | Jr | TPLS Christian Academy; Delaware | Washington, D.C. |
| G | 4 | Trayanna Crisp | 5 ft 8 in (1.73 m) | Fr | Millennium HS | Goodyear, AZ |
| G | 5 | Tatum Settelmyer (W) | 6 ft 0 in (1.83 m) | So | St. Charles North HS | St. Charles, IL |
| G | 11 | Sydney Erikstrup | 6 ft 1 in (1.85 m) | Jr | Beaverton HS | Portland, OR |
| G | 12 | Treasure Hunt | 6 ft 1 in (1.85 m) | Jr | Hamilton Heights Christian Academy; Kentucky | Chattanooga, TN |
| G/F | 13 | Maggie Besselink | 6 ft 3 in (1.91 m) | Jr | Holy Cross HS | Kingston, Ontario |
| F | 22 | Journey Thompson | 6 ft 3 in (1.91 m) | Fr | Peters Township HS | McMurray, PA |
| C | 24 | Kayla Mokwuah | 6 ft 4 in (1.93 m) | GS | Wilbraham & Monson Academy; TCU | Longmeadow, MA |
| F | 30 | Morasha Wiggins | 6 ft 0 in (1.83 m) | So | Kalamazoo HS | Kalamazoo, MI |
| F | 42 | Meg Newman | 6 ft 3 in (1.91 m) | So | North Central HS | Indianapolis, IN |
| C | 43 | Imogen Greenslade | 6 ft 4 in (1.93 m) | Jr | MLC School | Sydney, Australia |
| F | 44 | Isadora Sousa | 6 ft 0 in (1.83 m) | Sr | Colegio A-Escopo | Sao Paulo, Brazil |

Head coach

- Natasha Adair (South Florida)

Assistant coach(es)

- Darrell Mosley (Lincoln (PA))
- Mykala Walker (Wake Forest)
- Camille Collier (Wake Forest)

Legend

- (C) Team captain
- (S) Suspended
- (I) Ineligible
- (W) Walk-on
- Injured
- Current redshirt

Roster

== Schedule ==
| Date time, TV | Rank^{#} | Opponent^{#} | Result | Record | High points | High rebounds | High assists | Site (attendance) city, state |
Non-conference regular season
| November 7, 2022*; 8:00 p.m. | | Northern Arizona | W 69–68 | 1–0 | 22 – Simmons | 11 – Newman | 4 – Skinner | Desert Financial Arena (6,304); Tempe, AZ |
| November 11, 2022*; 2:30 p.m. | | Grambling State; Pac-12/SWAC Legacy Series | W 62–49 | 2–0 | 16 – Skinner | 11 – Hunt | 5 – Crisp | Desert Financial Arena (2,565); Tempe, AZ |
| November 15, 2022*; 7:00 p.m., ESPN+ | | at Montana State | W 79–64 | 3–0 | 24 – Skinner | 7 – Hunt | 3 – Tied | Brick Breeden Fieldhouse (1,653); Bozeman, MT |
| November 20, 2022*; 2:00 p.m., MW Network | | at New Mexico | W 83–77 ^{OT} | 4–0 | 24 – Skinner | 15 – Hunt | 4 – Simmons | The Pit (4,848); Albuquerque, NM |
| November 25, 2022*; 2:15 p.m., FloSports | | vs. American; Goombay Splash | W 70–61 | 5–0 | 24 – Skinner | 12 – Sousa | 2 – Tied | Gateway Christian Academy (255); Bimini, Bahamas |
| November 26, 2022*; 2:15 p.m., FloSports | | vs. No. 7 Notre Dame; Goombay Splash | L 65–85 | 5–1 | 15 – Skinner | 7 – Newman | 3 – Simmons | Gateway Christian Academy (261); Bimini, Bahamas |
| November 30, 2022*; 7:00 p.m., ESPN+ | | at Grand Canyon | W 80–72 | 6–1 | 29 – Skinner | 10 – Mokwuah | 6 – Simmons | GCU Arena (6,019); Phoenix, AZ |
| December 2, 2022*; 6:00 p.m. | | UMass; Briann January Classic | L 64–88 | 6–2 | 15 – Tied | 10 – Thompson | 6 – Simmons | Desert Financial Arena (1,762); Tempe, AZ |
| December 4, 2022*; 1:30 p.m. | | Missouri; Briann January Classic | L 60–71 | 6–3 | 29 – Skinner | 9 – Newman | 5 – Crisp | Desert Financial Arena (3,221); Tempe, AZ |
| December 11, 2022*; 3:00 p.m., ESPN+ | | at Stephen F. Austin | L 60–75 | 6–4 | 22 – Skinner | 7 – Newman | 6 – Skinner | William R. Johnson Coliseum (1,656); Nacogdoches, TX |
| December 17, 2022*; 2:00 p.m. | | Prairie View A&M | W 82–67 | 7–4 | 22 – Hunt | 18 – Newman | 7 – Skinner | Desert Financial Arena (1,577); Tempe, AZ |
Pac-12 regular season
| December 29, 2022; 6:00 p.m., P12N | | at No. 18 Arizona | L 66–84 | 7–5 (0–1) | 26 – Skinner | 9 – Newman | 5 – Simmons | McKale Center (9,495); Tucson, AZ |
| December 31, 2022; 7:00 p.m., P12N | | at Stanford | L 69–101 | 7–6 (0–2) | 20 – Skinner | 6 – Mokwuah | 3 – Sousa | Maples Pavilion (2,810); Stanford, CA |
| January 2, 2023; 1:00 p.m., P12N | | at California | L 61–74 | 7–7 (0–3) | 14 – Simmons | 10 – Skinner | 2 – Hunt | Haas Pavilion (842); Berkeley, CA |
| January 6, 2023; 6:00 p.m., P12N | | at No. 18 Oregon | L 62–82 | 7–8 (0–4) | 20 – Skinner | 12 – Hunt | 5 – Simmons | Desert Financial Arena (1,876); Tempe, AZ |
| January 8, 2023; 11:00 a.m., P12N | | Oregon State | L 59–69 | 7–9 (0–5) | 22 – Skinner | 12 – Thompson | 3 – Hunt | Desert Financial Arena (1,486); Tempe, AZ |
| January 13, 2023; 7:00 p.m. | | at No. 10 Utah | L 0–2 Forfeit | 7–9 (0–6) | – | – | – | Jon M. Huntsman Center; Salt Lake City, UT |
| January 15, 2023; 12:00 p.m. | | at Colorado | L 0–2 Forfeit | 7–9 (0–7) | – | – | – | CU Events Center; Boulder, CO |
| January 22, 2023; 3:00 p.m., P12N | | No. 19 Arizona | L 67–80 | 7–10 (0–8) | 24 – Hunt | 7 – Mokwuah | 6 – Skinner | Desert Financial Arena (3,508); Tempe, AZ |
| January 27, 2023; 6:00 p.m., P12N | | Washington State | L 57–61 | 7–11 (0–9) | 20 – Simmons | 6 – Tied | 3 – Skinner | Desert Financial Arena (2,349); Tempe, AZ |
| January 29, 2023; 12:00 p.m., P12N | | Washington | L 53–55 | 7–12 (0–10) | 11 – Tied | 8 – Simmons | 5 – Simmons | Desert Financial Arena (1,851); Tempe, AZ |
| February 3, 2023; 8:00 p.m., P12N | | at USC | L 49–64 | 7–13 (0–11) | 14 – Skinner | 7 – Hunt | 2 – Crisp | Galen Center (801); Los Angeles, CA |
| February 5, 2023; 1:00 p.m., P12N | | at No. 14 UCLA | L 63–82 | 7–14 (0–12) | 28 – Skinner | 7 – Simmons | 3 – Simmons | Pauley Pavilion (3,462); Los Angeles, CA |
| February 10, 2023; 7:00 p.m., P12N | | California | L 61–72 | 7–15 (0–13) | 17 – Skinner | 5 – Tied | 5 – Simmons | Desert Financial Arena (2,185); Tempe, AZ |
| February 12, 2023; 12:00 p.m., P12N | | No. 6 Stanford | L 64–96 | 7–16 (0–14) | 23 – Skinner | 5 – Tied | 5 – Skinner | Desert Financial Arena (1,759); Tempe, AZ |
| February 17, 2023; 11:00 a.m., P12N | | No. 21 Colorado | L 62–70 | 7–17 (0–15) | 27 – Skinner | 8 – Hunt | 3 – Tied | Desert Financial Arena (2,793); Tempe, AZ |
| February 19, 2023; 12:00 p.m., P12N | | No. 4 Utah | L 69–74 | 7–18 (0–16) | 15 – Erikstrup | 10 – Erikstrup | 6 – Simmons | Desert Financial Arena (2,393); Tucson, AZ |
| February 23, 2023; 8:00 p.m., P12N | | at Oregon State | W 75–73 | 8–18 (1–16) | 27 – Skinner | 8 – Tied | 6 – Simmons | Gill Coliseum (3,711); Corvallis, OR |
| February 25, 2023; 1:00 p.m., P12N | | at Oregon | L 48–77 | 8–19 (1–17) | 15 – Skinner | 6 – Hunt | 3 – Simmons | Matthew Knight Arena (6,757); Eugene, OR |
Pac-12 Tournament
| March 1, 2023; 1:00 p.m., P12N | (12) | vs. (5) No. 19 UCLA; First Round | L 70–81 ^{OT} | 8–20 | 26 – Skinner | 10 – Simmons | 4 – Sousa | Michelob Ultra Arena (3,292); Paradise, NV |
*Non-conference game. ^{#}Rankings from AP Poll. (#) Tournament seedings in parentheses. All times are in Mountain Time.

== Rankings ==
Ranking movements Legend: ██ Increase in ranking ██ Decrease in ranking — = Not ranked RV = Received votes
| | Week | | | | | | | | | | | | | | | | | | | | |
| Poll | Pre | 1 | 2 | 3 | 4 | 5 | 6 | 7 | 8 | 9 | 10 | 11 | 12 | 13 | 14 | 15 | 16 | 17 | 18 | 19 | Final |
|---|---|---|---|---|---|---|---|---|---|---|---|---|---|---|---|---|---|---|---|---|---|
| AP | — | —* | — | — | — | — | — | — | — | — | — | — | — | | | | | | | | Not released |
| Coaches | — | —* | —^ | — | — | — | — | — | RV | — | — | — | — | | | | | | | | |

*The preseason and Week 1 polls were the same.
^Coaches did not release a Week 2 poll.

== See also ==
2022–23 Arizona State Sun Devils men's basketball team
