= 2022–23 Washington State Cougars women's basketball team =

American college basketball season

2022–23 Washington State Cougars women's basketball

Pac-12 tournament champions

NCAA tournament, first round
- Conference: Pac-12 Conference

Ranking
- AP: No. 23
- Record: 23–11 (9–9 Pac-12)
- Head coach: Kamie Ethridge (5th season)
- Assistant coaches: Laurie Koehn; Jason Chainey; Camille Williams
- Home arena: Beasley Coliseum

2022–23 Pac-12 Conference women's basketball standings
	Conf.				Overall
Team	W		L	PCT	W		L	PCT
No. 8 Utah	15	–	3	.833	27	–	5	.844
No. 5 Stanford	15	–	3	.833	29	–	6	.829
No. 21 Colorado	13	–	5	.722	25	–	9	.735
No. 14 UCLA	11	–	7	.611	27	–	10	.730
No. 25 Arizona	11	–	7	.611	22	–	10	.688
USC	11	–	7	.611	21	–	10	.677
No. 23 Washington State †	9	–	9	.500	23	–	11	.676
Oregon	7	–	11	.389	20	–	15	.571
Washington	7	–	11	.389	19	–	15	.559
California	4	–	14	.222	13	–	17	.433
Oregon State	4	–	14	.222	13	–	18	.419
Arizona State	1	–	17	.056	8	–	20	.286
† 2023 Pac-12 Tournament winner Rankings from AP poll

The 2022–23 Washington State Cougars women's basketball team represented Washington State University during the 2022–23 NCAA Division I women's basketball season. The Cougars were led by fifth-year head coach Kamie Ethridge and played their home games at Beasley Coliseum as members of the Pac-12 Conference.

== Previous season ==
In 2021–22, the Cougars finished with an overall record of 19–11, and finished conference play with a 11–6 record. As the #3 seed in the tournament, the Cougars lost to the #6 seed Utah in the quarterfinals. The Cougars received an at-large bid to the 2022 NCAA Division I women's basketball tournament and were the #8 seed in the Bridgeport Regional. The Cougars lost in the first round to the #9 seed South Florida, and were eliminated.

== Offseason ==
=== Departures ===
Washington State departures
Name	Num	Pos.	Height	Year	Hometown	Reason for departure
Michaela Jones	2	G	5'10"	(redshirt) Junior	Wymore, NE	
Krystal Leger-Walker	4	G	5'9"	(redshirt) Senior	Waikato, New Zealand	Graduated
Ekin Celikdemir	10	G	5'10"	Freshman	Istanbul, Turkey	Left the team for personal reasons
Shir Levy	13	F	5'11"	Junior	Ness Ziona, Israel	
Celena Molina	22	G	5'9"	(redshirt) Junior	Kailua-Kona, HI	Graduated

==== Recruiting ====
There was no recruiting class of 2022.

==== Recruiting class of 2023 ====
College recruiting (2023)
Name	Hometown	School	Height	Weight	Commit date
Jenna Villa; G	Arlington, WA	Arlington High School	6 ft 1 in (1.85 m)	N/A	
Jenna Villa; G	Recruit ratings: ESPN: (93)				
Overall recruit ranking:
Note: In many cases, Scout, Rivals, 247Sports, On3, and ESPN may conflict in their listings of height and weight.; In these cases, the average was taken. ESPN grades are on a 100-point scale.; Sources: "2023 Player Commits". ESPN. Archived from the original on January 18, 2023.

== Roster ==
2022–23 Washington State Cougars women's basketball team
Players
Coaches

Pos.	#	Name	Height	Year	Previous school	Hometown
G	0	Kaia Woods	5 ft 3 in (1.6 m)	So	Royal Crown Academy	Tiffin, OH
G	1	Tara Wallack	6 ft 2 in (1.88 m)	So	Semiahmoo Secondary	South Surrey, BC
G	3	Emma Nankervis	6 ft 3 in (1.91 m)	Sr	Toorak College	Mount Eliza, Australia
G	5	Charlisse Leger-Walker	5 ft 10 in (1.78 m)	Jr	St. Peter's School	Waikato, New Zealand
G	11	Astera Tuhina	5 ft 9 in (1.75 m)	Fr	Deportivo Promete	Pristina, Kosovo
G	12	Kyra Gardner	5 ft 11 in (1.8 m)	Fr	Raymond HS	Raymond, WA
C	14	Jessica Clarke	6 ft 3 in (1.91 m)	Jr	St. Thomas Aquinas	North Vancouver, BC
F	15	Ula Motuga	6 ft 0 in (1.83 m)	GS	Caterbury College	Logan, Australia
G	20	Grace Sarver	5 ft 8 in (1.73 m)	Sr	West Seattle	Seattle, WA
G	21	Johanna Teder	5 ft 8 in (1.73 m)	Sr	South Plains College	Tartu, Estonia
F/C	25	Lauren Glazier	6 ft 4 in (1.93 m)	Fr	Mount Si HS	North Bend, WA
G	45	Cia Eklöf	5 ft 10 in (1.78 m)	Fr	Mäkelänrinteen Lukio	Helsinki, Finland
C	55	Bella Murekatete	6 ft 3 in (1.91 m)	Sr	Genesis Prep Academy	Ngoma Huye, Nigeria

Head coach

- Kamie Ethridge (Texas)

Assistant coach(es)

- Laurie Koehn (Kansas State)
- Jason Chainey (Yeronga Institute of TAFE)
- Camille Williams (Wisconsin)

Legend

- (C) Team captain
- (S) Suspended
- (I) Ineligible
- (W) Walk-on
- Injured
- Current redshirt

Roster
Last update: July 21, 2024

== Schedule ==
Date time, TV	Rank^{#}	Opponent^{#}	Result	Record	High points	High rebounds	High assists	Site (attendance) city, state
Exhibition
October 30, 2022*; 2:00 p.m.		Westmont	W 64–40		26 – Murekatete	10 – Murekatete	6 – Leger-Walker	Beasley Coliseum; Pullman, WA
Regular season
November 7, 2022*; 12:00 p.m.		Loyola Marymount	W 93–41	1–0	18 – Murekatete	7 – tied	8 – Tuhina	Beasley Coliseum (321); Pullman, WA
November 11, 2022*; 1:00 p.m., WCC Network		at San Francisco	W 69–63	2–0	35 – Leger-Walker	7 – tied	4 – Leger-Walker	War Memorial Coliseum (143); San Francisco, CA
November 13, 2022*; 12:00 p.m., P12N		Prairie View A&M; Pac-12/SWAC Legacy Series	W 89–61	3–0	24 – Leger-Walker	11 – Murekatete	6 – tied	Beasley Coliseum (730); Pullman, WA
November 18, 2022*; 5:00 p.m.		vs. BYU; Northshore Showcase	L 56–65	3–1	21 – Leger-Walker	4 – Wallack	3 – tied	George Q. Cannon Activities Center (509); Laie, HI
November 21, 2022*; 3:00 p.m.		vs. Troy; Northshore Showcase	W 87–72	4–1	22 – Murekatete	16 – Murekatete	6 – Leger-Walker	George Q. Cannon Activities Center (76); Laie, HI
November 28, 2022*; 7:00 p.m.		South Dakota State	W 61–41	5–1	17 – Teder	7 – Murekatete	4 – Leger-Walker	Beasley Coliseum (630); Pullman, WA
December 2, 2022*; 6:00 p.m.		Montana	W 77–57	6–1	24 – Leger-Walker	8 – Motuga	6 – Leger-Walker	Beasley Coliseum (792); Pullman, WA
December 7, 2022*; 6:00 p.m.		at Portland	W 69–63	7–1	15 – Leger-Walker	9 – Leger-Walker	6 – Motuga	Chiles Center (519); Portland, OR
December 11, 2022; 2:00 p.m., P12N		at Washington	L 66–82	7–2 (0–1)	40 – Leger-Walker	11 – Wallack	4 – Motuga	Alaska Airlines Arena (2,753); Seattle, WA
December 17, 2022*; 1:00 p.m.		Jackson State	W 83–56	8–2	20 – Leger-Walker	10 – Murekatete	5 – tied	Beasley Coliseum (553); Pullman, WA
December 19, 2022*; 5:00 p.m., ESPN+		at Texas A&M–Corpus Christi	W 75–49	9–2	20 – tied	7 – tied	6 – Leger-Walker	Dugan Wellness Center (759); Corpus Christi, TX
December 21, 2022*; 10:30 a.m., ESPN+		at Houston	W 70–63	10–2	14 – Motuga	10 – Murekatete	5 – Leger-Walker	Fertitta Center (678); Houston, TX
December 30, 2022; 5:00 p.m., P12N		No. 11 Utah	L 66–71	10–3 (0–2)	20 – Murekatete	11 – Murekatete	6 – Murekatete	Beasley Coliseum (887); Pullman, WA
January 1, 2023; 4:00 p.m., P12N		Colorado	L 54–65	10–4 (0–3)	15 – Murekatete	8 – Motuga	4 – tied	Beasley Coliseum (680); Pullman, WA
January 8, 2023; 12:00 p.m., P12N		Washington	W 66–52	11–4 (1–3)	26 – Leger-Walker	8 – Murekatete	4 – Leger-Walker	Beasley Coliseum (1,057); Pullman, WA
January 13, 2023; 7:00 p.m., P12N		at Oregon State	W 63–56	12–4 (2–3)	17 – Wallack	7 – Leger-Walker	8 – Leger-Walker	Gill Coliseum (4,039); Corvallis, OR
January 15, 2023; 12:00 p.m., P12N		at No. 21 Oregon	W 85–84 ^{OT}	13–4 (3–3)	20 – Murekatete	10 – Motuga	5 – Murekatete	Matthew Knight Arena (6,900); Eugene, OR
January 20, 2023; 7:00 p.m., P12N		USC	L 44–51	13–5 (3–4)	13 – Tuhina	7 – Motuga	3 – Sarver	Beasley Coliseum (956); Pullman, WA
January 22, 2023; 12:00 p.m., P12N		No. 9 UCLA	L 66–73	13–6 (3–5)	15 – Tuhina	6 – tied	2 – tied	Beasley Coliseum (986); Pullman, WA
January 27, 2023; 5:00 p.m., P12N		at Arizona State	W 61–57	14–6 (4–5)	15 – Wallack	11 – Wallack	3 – tied	Desert Financial Arena (2,349); Tempe, AZ
January 29, 2023; 11:00 a.m., P12N		at No. 19 Arizona	W 70–59	15–6 (5–5)	18 – Murekatete	12 – Wallack	7 – Leger-Walker	McKale Center (7,494); Tucson, AZ
February 3, 2023; 7:00 p.m., P12N		No. 2 Stanford	L 38–71	15–7 (5–6)	8 – Leger-Walker	6 – Leger-Walker	2 – tied	Beasley Coliseum (1,128); Pullman, WA
February 5, 2023; 12:00 p.m., P12N		California	W 70–60	16–7 (6–6)	25 – Leger-Walker	5 – tied	5 – Leger-Walker	Beasley Coliseum (1,345); Pullman, WA
February 10, 2023; 6:00 p.m., P12N		at No. 25 Colorado	L 68–71	16–8 (6–7)	17 – Leger-Walker	10 – Leger-Walker	6 – Teder	CU Events Center (2,055); Boulder, CO
February 12, 2023; 11:00 a.m., P12N		at No. 7 Utah	L 59–73	16–9 (6–8)	18 – Murekatete	14 – Murekatete	3 – tied	Jon M. Huntsman Center (3,268); Salt Lake City, UT
February 17, 2023; 7:00 p.m., P12N		Oregon	W 64–57	17–9 (7–8)	17 – Murekatete	7 – tied	5 – Leger-Walker	Beasley Coliseum (1,061); Pullman, WA
February 19, 2023; 12:00 p.m., P12N		Oregon State	W 67–57	18–9 (8–8)	19 – Murekatete	9 – Murekatete	6 – Leger-Walker	Beasley Coliseum (1,500); Pullman, WA
February 23, 2023; 6:00 p.m., P12N		at No. 17 UCLA	W 62–55	19–9 (9–8)	15 – tied	10 – Murekatete	4 – tied	Pauley Pavilion (2,825); Los Angeles, CA
February 25, 2023; 12:00 p.m., P12N		at USC	L 65–68 ^{2OT}	19–10 (9–9)	17 – tied	10 – Leger-Walker	5 – Leger-Walker	Galen Center (2,832); Los Angeles, CA
Pac-12 women's tournament
March 1, 2023; 6:00 p.m., P12N	(7)	vs. (10) California; First round	W 61–49	20–10	23 – Leger-Walker	12 – Murekatete	4 – Tuhina	Michelob Ultra Arena; Paradise, NV
March 2, 2023; 6:00 p.m., P12N	(7)	vs. (2) No. 3 Utah; Quarterfinals	W 66–58	21–10	19 – Murekatete	8 – tied	5 – Leger-Walker	Michelob Ultra Arena; Paradise, NV
March 3, 2023; 8:30 p.m., P12N	(7)	vs. (3) No. 20 Colorado; Semifinals	W 61–49	22–10	15 – Leger-Walker	8 – Murekatete	5 – Teder	Michelob Ultra Arena; Paradise, NV
March 5, 2023; 2:00 p.m., ESPN2	(7)	vs. (5) No. 19 UCLA; Final	W 65–61	23–10	23 – Leger-Walker	8 – Wallack	6 – Tuhina	Michelob Ultra Arena (5,032); Paradise, NV
NCAA women's tournament
March 18, 2023*; 11:30 a.m., ESPNU	(5 G2) No. 23	vs. (12 G2) Florida Gulf Coast; First round	L 63–74	23–11	16 – Wallack	12 – Wallack	6 – Tuhina	Finneran Pavilion; Villanova, PA
*Non-conference game. ^{#}Rankings from AP poll. (#) Tournament seedings in parentheses. G=Greenville 2. All times are in Pacific.

== Rankings ==
Ranking movements Legend: ██ Increase in ranking ██ Decrease in ranking — = Not ranked RV = Received votes
	Week																				
Poll	Pre	1	2	3	4	5	6	7	8	9	10	11	12	13	14	15	16	17	18	19	Final
AP	RV	RV*	RV	—	—	—	—	—	—	—	—	—	—	—	—	—	—	—	—	23	Not released
Coaches	—	—*	RV^	—	—	—	—	—	—	—	—	—	—	—	—	—	—	—	RV	RV	RV

*The preseason and week 1 polls were the same.
^Coaches did not release a week 2 poll.

== See also ==
- 2022–23 Washington State Cougars men's basketball team
