= Leanne Walker =

New Zealand basketball player

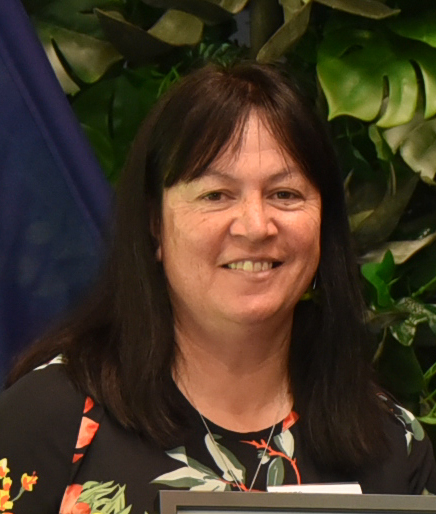
Walker in 2020

Leanne Walker (born 17 July 1968) is a New Zealand former basketball player who competed in the 2000 Summer Olympics and in the 2004 Summer Olympics with the New Zealand women's national basketball team Tall Ferns. She was the team captain in the 2004 Olympics in Greece. Walker also competed for New Zealand at the 1994 World Championship held in Australia. She has been an assistant coach for the Northern Kāhu in the Tauihi Basketball Aotearoa New Zealand professional women's basketball league.

Walker, with husband Eliu Leger, has three daughters who also play basketball. Krystal Leger-Walker played college basketball with the Northern Colorado Bears and Washington State Cougars, and most recently in 2025 for Northern Kahu in New Zealand TBA. Charlisse Leger-Walker played college basketball for Washington State Cougars and UCLA Bruins. With the Bruins, Charlisse won the NCAA championship, the first Kiwi to do so. Charlisse is the first New Zealander to be drafted into the WNBA. Tannika Leger-Walker joined the Nebraska-Omaha Mavericks roster in 2025 as a freshman.
