= Charlisse Leger-Walker =

New Zealand basketball player

- Leger-Walker with the Connecticut Sun in 2026

No. 5 – Tokomanawa Queens
- Position: Guard
- League: Tauihi Basketball Aotearoa

Personal information
- Born: 15 September 2001 (age 25) Hamilton, New Zealand
- Listed height: 5 ft 10 in (1.78 m)
- Listed weight: 190 lb (86 kg)

Career information
- High school: St. Peter's Cambridge (Cambridge, New Zealand)
- College: Washington State (2020–2024); UCLA (2025–2026)
- WNBA draft: 2026: 2nd round, 18th overall pick
- Drafted by: Connecticut Sun

Career history
- 2026: Connecticut Sun
- 2026–present: Tokomanawa Queens

Career highlights
- NCAA champion (2026); 4× All-Pac-12 Team (2021–2024); Pac-12 Freshman of the Year (2021); Pac-12 All-Freshman Team (2021); Pac-12 tournament MOP (2023)
- Stats at Basketball Reference
Medals
Women's basketball
Representing New Zealand
Commonwealth Games
Bronze medal – third place	2018 Australia	Team
FIBA Oceania Under-18 Championship
Silver medal – second place	2016 Fiji	Team
FIBA Oceania Under-17 Championship
Silver medal – second place	2017 Guam	Team
FIBA Oceania Under-16 Championship
Silver medal – second place	2015 New Zealand	Team
Women's 3x3 basketball
Representing New Zealand
FIBA 3x3 U18 World Cup
Silver medal – second place	2019 Mongolia

Charlisse Trinity Leger-Walker (born 15 September 2001) is a New Zealand professional basketball player for the Houston Comets of the Women's National Basketball Association (WNBA). She was the youngest person to play on the New Zealand women's national basketball team when she debuted with the Tall Ferns at the 2018 Commonwealth Games. She played college basketball in the United States for the Washington State Cougars and UCLA Bruins. With the Bruins, she won the 2026 NCAA Division I women's basketball championship game, the first Kiwi to do so. She is the first New Zealander to be drafted into the WNBA and the second to play in the league after Megan Compain.

== High school ==
Leger-Walker won New Zealand junior titles with both St Peter's School, Cambridge and Waikato Basketball. Her teams appeared in the Grand Final at Schick Secondary Schools Nationals in all five years in high school, winning the championship on four occasions. She won a record four MVP trophies in the Nationals. She was head girl at St. Peter's in her senior year.

== College career ==
During her college career, Leger-Walker was on the roster for four years at Washington State and two years at UCLA. She was granted two years of extra eligibility. All NCAA athletes were given an extra year of eligibility in 2020 due to the COVID-19 pandemic impact to the 2020 season. For her medical redshirt season due to injury, she also was granted an extra year of eligibility.

=== Washington State ===
As a freshman at Washington State, Leger-Walker averaged 18.8 points, 5.3 rebounds, and 3.1 assists per game. She was named Pac-12 Freshman of the Year and made the all-conference team. In her sophomore season, Leger-Walker repeated as an All-Pac-12 selection, averaging 16.1 points and 5.2 rebounds per game. On 11 December 2022, she scored a career-high 40 points in an 82–66 loss to Washington. Leger-Walker led No. 7 seed Washington State to the 2023 Pac-12 tournament title, the first in program history, and was named most outstanding player. She finished her junior season averaging 17.7 points, 5.5 rebounds, and 4.1 assists per game, and earned All-Pac-12 honors.

In her fourth season, on 23 November 2023, Leger-Walker became the second Washington State player to record a triple-double, with 11 points, 15 rebounds, and 13 assists in an 87–67 win over Maryland. In a January 28, 2024 game at against the number 2 ranked UCLA Bruins in Los Angeles, Leger-Walker suffered a knee injury as the Cougars won 85-82 against the highest-ranked opponent in WSU basketball history. Leger-Walker missed the last 11 games of the season with a torn ACL. As a senior, she was named All-Pac-12 for a fourth time and averaged 13.2 points, 6.5 rebounds, and 5.1 assists per game. Leger-Walker’s 1,743 career points ranked third in school history. She ranked second in 3-point baskets (199), third in minutes played (3,794) and fourth in scoring average (16.6), total baskets (607) and assists (389).

=== UCLA ===
Leger-Walker transferred to UCLA for her fifth season of eligibility, granted due to the COVID-19 pandemic. This was the first season that UCLA competed in the Big Ten conference. On December 6, 2024, UCLA announced that Leger-Walker would redshirt the 2024–25 season to fully rehabilitate her ACL injury.

She was a starter on the 2025-26 team that went 37-1, and won the Big Ten conference and Big Ten tournament championships. In the 2026 NCAA Division I women's basketball tournament, the Bruins were the number 2 seed overall and number one in the Sacramento region. Reaching the final four, the Bruins won the re-match with the Texas Longhorns, the one loss they experienced all season. In a dominating performance, UCLA defeated South Carolina 79-51 in the national championship game. She was the team leader in steals (60) and assists (213) and at the start of the 2026-27 season was fifth on the all-time UCLA season assists list. She wore jersey number 5 while at UCLA.

== Professional career ==
=== WNBA ===
Leger-Walker was drafted 18th overall by the Connecticut Sun in the 2026 WNBA draft. Her UCLA teammate and roommate, Gianna Kneepkens, was also drafted by the Sun. UCLA set the WNBA draft record for most players from one class drafted with six players.

=== Tauihi Basketball Aotearoa (New Zealand League) ===
In August 2026, Leger-Walker and her sister Krystal announced that they will be joining the Tokomanawa Queens in September 2026.

== National team career ==
Leger-Walker made her debut for the New Zealand women's national basketball team at the 2018 Commonwealth Games. At age 16, she became the youngest player to play for the senior national team. She averaged 11.3 points and 4.2 rebounds per game, helping New Zealand win the bronze medal. Leger-Walker won a silver medal at the 2019 FIBA 3x3 U18 World Cup, the first medal by a New Zealand women's team at a FIBA world tournament, and was named to the all-tournament team.

== Personal life ==
Leger-Walker is of Māori (Te Whakatōhea, Ngāti Porou), Samoan and Tongan descent. Her mother Leanne Walker, played for the New Zealand women's national basketball team; she competed in the Summer Olympics in 2000 and 2004. Leger-Walker's older sister, Krystal, played basketball for Northern Colorado and was her teammate at Washington State before turning professional. Leger-Walker gives credit to her father, Eliu Leger, who did not play basketball, as being "the one who always grounds me and brings me back to the present."

== Career statistics ==
Legend
GP	Games played	GS	Games started	MPG	Minutes per game	RPG	Rebounds per game
APG	Assists per game	SPG	Steals per game	BPG	Blocks per game	PPG	Points per game
TO	Turnovers per game	FG%	Field-goal percentage	3P%	3-point field-goal percentage	FT%	Free-throw percentage
**Bold**	Career best	°	League leader

=== College ===
Year	Team	GP	GS	MPG	FG%	3P%	FT%	RPG	APG	SPG	BPG	TO	PPG
2020–21	Washington State	24	24	**37.8**	35.3	32.8	78.6	5.3	3.1	**2.3**	0.7	2.7	**18.8**
2021–22	Washington State	30	30	36.0	37.7	27.2	76.0	5.2	2.8	1.6	**0.8**	2.7	16.1
2022–23	Washington State	30	30	36.8	40.3	**34.9**	**83.3**	5.5	4.1	1.3	0.6	3.2	17.7
2023–24	Washington State	21	21	33.3	40.6	23.7	81.7	**6.5**	5.1	1.7	0.3	3.2	13.2
2024–25	UCLA	Did not play due to injury											
2025–26	UCLA	**38**	**38**	28.0	**45.7**	**35.5**	64.1	4.0	**5.6**	1.6	0.3	**2.2**	8.4
**Career**		143	143	34.0	39.3	31.4	78.4	5.1	4.2	1.7	0.6	2.7	14.4
Statistics retrieved from Sports-Reference.
