= 2022–23 BYU Cougars women's basketball team =

Intercollegiate basketball season

2022–23 BYU Cougars women's basketball

WNIT, First Round
- Conference: West Coast Conference
- Record: 16–17 (9–9 WCC)
- Head coach: Amber Whiting (1st season)
- Assistant coaches: Lee Cummard (4th season); Morgan Bailey (1st season); Aaron Kallhoff (1st season)
- Home arena: Marriott Center

2022–23 West Coast Conference women's basketball standings
	Conf.				Overall
Team	W		L	PCT	W		L	PCT
No. 19 Gonzaga	17	–	1	.944	28	–	5	.848
Portland†	15	–	3	.833	23	–	9	.719
San Diego	11	–	7	.611	19	–	14	.576
BYU	9	–	9	.500	16	–	17	.485
San Francisco	9	–	9	.500	19	–	13	.594
Pacific	8	–	10	.444	15	–	17	.469
Saint Mary's	6	–	12	.333	13	–	18	.419
Santa Clara	6	–	12	.333	15	–	17	.469
Pepperdine	5	–	13	.278	11	–	19	.367
Loyola Marymount	4	–	14	.222	7	–	23	.233
† 2023 WCC tournament winner As of March 24, 2023; Rankings from AP poll

The 2022–23 BYU Cougars women's basketball team represented Brigham Young University during the 2022–23 NCAA Division I women's basketball season. It was head coach Amber Whiting's first season at BYU after Jeff Judkins retired at the end of the previous season. The Cougars, playing as members of the West Coast Conference for the final season, played their home games at the Marriott Center.

== Before the season ==
=== Departures ===
After a season in which most players returned due to COVID-19 regulations, BYU finds themselves having lost quite a few seniors and last season's leading scorer.

Name	Number	Pos.	Height	Year	Hometown	Notes
Shaylee Gonzales	2	G	5'10"	Sophomore	Gilbert, Arizona	Transferred to Texas
Maria Albiero	5	G	5'8"	Senior	Londrina, Brazil	Graduated, playing professionally at Basquete Blumenau in Brazil
Tegan Graham	10	G	6'0'	Graduate	Wellington, New Zealand	Graduated
Paisley Harding	13	G	5'9"	Senior	Everett, Washington	Graduated, Signed a training contract with the Seattle Storm
Sara Hamson	22	C	6'7"	Senior	Lindon, Utah	Graduated

=== Newcomers ===
Name	Number	Pos.	Height	Year	Hometown	Notes
Gabriela Bosquez	0	G	5'7	Senior	Kyle, Texas	Transferred from Arizona State
Eliza Galbreath	10	F	6'0	Junior	Ritzville, Washington	Transfer from Southern Virginia
Alyssa Blanck	15	F	6'2	Freshman	Salt Lake City, Utah	

== 2022–23 media ==
=== BYU Sports Media ===
All Cougars home games will be shown on BYUtv or the BYUtv App. Conference road games will shown on WCC Network and Stadium College Sports. Most remaining non-conference road games will also being streamed. Streaming partners for those games can be found on the schedule.

== Roster ==
2022–23 BYU Cougars women's basketball team
Players
Coaches

Pos.	#	Name	Height	Year	Previous school	Hometown
G	0	Gabriela Bosquez	5 ft 7 in (1.7 m)	Sr	Arizona State	Kyle, TX
G	1	Amanda Barcello	5 ft 11 in (1.8 m)	So	Seton Catholic	Chandler, AZ
G	3	Nani Falatea	5 ft 9 in (1.75 m)	So	East	Salt Lake City, UT
G	4	Sophia Lee	5 ft 8 in (1.73 m)	Fr	Saint Mary's	Stockton, CA
G	5	Arielle Mackey-Williams	5 ft 9 in (1.75 m)	Jr	Tai Wananga Ki Ruakura	Ngati Porou, New Zealand
F	10	Eliza Galbreath	6 ft 0 in (1.83 m)	Jr	Lind-Ritzville	Ritzville, WA
F	11	Kaylee Smiler	5 ft 8 in (1.73 m)	RS Jr	Melville	Hamilton, New Zealand
F	12	Lauren Gustin	5 ft 8 in (1.73 m)	RS Jr	Salem Hills; Salt Lake CC; Idaho	Salem, UT
G	13	Sierra Johnson	6 ft 0 in (1.83 m)	So	Jasper	Jasper, AR
F	15	Alyssa Blanck	6 ft 2 in (1.88 m)	Fr	Olympus	Holladay, UT
G	20	Devry Millett	5 ft 10 in (1.78 m)	So	Folsom	Folsom, CA
F	21	Heather Hamson	6 ft 3 in (1.91 m)	So	Pleasant Grove	Lindon, UT
F	24	Rose Bubakar	6 ft 0 in (1.83 m)	So	Frederick	Frederick, MD
F	25	Emma Calvert	6 ft 4 in (1.93 m)	So	Fremont	Farr West, UT
G	30	Kate Vorwaller	5 ft 9 in (1.75 m)	So	Skyline	Salt Lake City, UT
G	31	Mayci Taylor	5 ft 9 in (1.75 m)	So	Cedar	Salina, UT

Head coach

- Amber Whiting (BYU)

Assistant coach(es)

- Lee Cummard (BYU)
- Morgan Bailey (BYU)
- Aaron Kallhoff (Bemidji State)
- Natalie Lainhart- Director of Operations (BYU)

Legend

- (C) Team captain
- (S) Suspended
- (I) Ineligible
- (W) Walk-on
- Injured
- Current redshirt

Roster

== Schedule ==
Date time, TV	Rank^{#}	Opponent^{#}	Result	Record	Site city, state
Exhibition
October 27, 2022*; 7:00pm, byutv.org		Westminster	W 72–51	–	Marriott Center; Provo, UT
Non-conference regular season
November 8, 2022*; 6:00pm, MW Net		at Colorado State	L 62–82	0–1	Moby Arena; Ft. Collins, CO
November 12, 2022*; 2:00pm, byutv.org		Montana State	L 60–69	0–2	Marriott Center; Provo, UT
November 15, 2022*; 3:00pm, byutv.org		No. 16 Oklahoma	L 66–77	0–3	Marriott Center; Provo, UT
November 18, 2022*; 6:00pm, Be the Beast		vs. Washington State; North Shore Showcase	W 65–56	1–3	George Q. Cannon Activities Center; Laie, HI
November 19, 2022*; 6:00pm, Be the Beast		vs. Troy; North Shore Showcase	L 62–68	1–4	George Q. Cannon Activities Center; Laie, HI
November 23, 2022*; 2:00pm, byutv.org		Carroll College	W 71–47	2–4	Marriott Center; Provo, UT
November 26, 2022*; 2:00pm, BYUtv		Ball State	L 56–61	2–5	Marriott Center; Provo, UT
December 1, 2022*; 6:30pm, SCS Pacific		at Boise State	W 76–67	3–5	ExtraMile Arena; Boise, ID
December 6, 2022*; 11:00am, SCS Pacific		at Utah State	W 64–54	4–5	Dee Glen Smith Spectrum; Logan, UT
December 10, 2022*; 5:00pm, BYUtv		No. 15 Utah; Deseret First Duel	L 56–79	4–6	Marriott Center; Provo, UT
December 21, 2022*; 1:00pm, byutv.org		Monmouth	W 70–50	5–8	Marriott Center; Provo, UT
WCC regular season
December 17, 2022; 3:00pm, SWX		at No. 23 Gonzaga	L 58–67	4–7 (0–1)	McCarthey Athletic Center; Spokane, WA
December 19, 2022; 7:00pm, SCS Pacific		at Portland	L 45–67	4–8 (0–2)	Chiles Center; Portland, OR
December 29, 2022; 7:00pm, BYUtv		Pacific	W 69–51	6–8 (1–2)	Marriott Center; Provo, UT
December 31, 2022; 2:00pm, byutv.org		Saint Mary's	W 66–41	7–8 (2–2)	Marriott Center; Provo, UT
January 7, 2023; 2:00pm, BYUtv		San Diego	W 63–49	8–8 (3–2)	Marriott Center; Provo, UT
January 12, 2023; 8:00pm, SCS Central		at Loyola Marymount	W 63–46	9–8 (4–2)	Gersten Pavilion; Los Angeles, CA
January 14, 2023; 3:00pm, SCS Atlantic		at Pepperdine	W 63–52	10–8 (5–2)	Firestone Fieldhouse; Malibu, CA
January 19, 2023; 11:00am, BYUtv		San Francisco	W 78–59	11–8 (6–2)	Marriott Center; Provo, UT
January 21, 2023; 2:00pm, BYUtv		Santa Clara	L 59–69	11–9 (6–3)	Marriott Center; Provo, UT
January 26, 2023; 7:30pm, SCS Atlantic		at Saint Mary's	W 74-59	12–9 (7–3)	University Credit Union Pavilion; Moraga, CA
January 28, 2023; 3:00pm, WCC Net		at Pacific	L 66–79	12–10 (7–4)	Alex G. Spanos Center; Stockton, CA
February 4, 2023; 3:00pm		at San Diego	L 49–52	12–11 (7–5)	Jenny Craig Pavilion; San Diego, CA
February 9, 2023; 7:00pm, BYUtv or byutv.org		Pepperdine	L 63–64 ^{OT}	12–12 (7–6)	Marriott Center; Provo, UT
February 11, 2023; 2:00pm, BYUtv or byutv.org		Loyola Marymount	W 67–42	13–12 (8–6)	Marriott Center; Provo, UT
February 16, 2023; 7:00pm		at Santa Clara	W 78–72	14–12 (9–6)	Leavey Center; Santa Clara, CA
February 18, 2023; 3:00pm		at San Francisco	L 59–72	14–13 (9–7)	The Sobrato Center; San Francisco, CA
February 25, 2023; 2:00pm, BYUtv or byutv.org		No. 18 Gonzaga	L 51–58	14–14 (9–8)	Marriott Center; Provo, UT
February 27, 2023; 4:00pm, BYUtv		Portland; Rescheduled from February 23	L 49–61	14–15 (9–9)	Marriott Center (815); Provo, UT
WCC Tournament
March 3, 2023; 1:00pm, BYUtv	(5)	vs. (9) Pepperdine; Second Round	W 74–59	15–15	Orleans Arena; Paradise, NV
March 4, 2023; 2:00pm, BYUtv	(5)	vs. (4) San Francisco; Quarterfinals	W 66–56	16–15	Orleans Arena; Paradise, NV
March 6, 2023; 1:00pm, BYUtv	(5)	vs. (1) No. 16 Gonzaga; Semifinals	L 64–79	16–16	Orleans Arena; Paradise, NV
WNIT
March 17, 2023*; 7:00pm, BYUtv		Rice; WNIT	L 67–71	16–17	Marriott Center; Provo, UT
*Non-conference game. ^{#}Rankings from AP Poll. (#) Tournament seedings in parentheses. All times are in Mountain.

–

== Game summaries ==
=== Exhibition: Westminster ===
Broadcasters: Jason Shepherd and Kristen Kozlowski

Starting Lineups:

- Westminster: Rae Falatea, Margarita Satini, Lyndzi Rich, Ashley Greenwood, Elizabeth Means
- BYU: Gabriela Bosquez, Amanda Barcello, Nani Falatea, Lauren Gustin, Emma Calvert

byutv.org

Oct. 27
7 p.m. MDT

Recap

Westminster Griffins 51, BYU Cougars 72
Scoring by quarter: 13–14, 9–21, 15–22, 14–15
Pts: Ashley Greenwood 15; Rebs: Ashley Greenwood 6 Asts: Margarita Satini 4	Pts: Lauren Gustin 25; Rebs: Lauren Gustin 24; Asts: Nani Falatea 7

Marriott Center
Provo, UT
Attendance: 1,215
Referees: Teresa Turner, Teresa Olsen, McCall Judd

=== Colorado State ===
Broadcasters: Adam Nigon

Series History: BYU leads series 55–24
Starting Lineups:

- BYU: Amanda Barcello, Nani Falatea, Arielle Mackey-Williams, Lauren Gustin, Emma Calvert
- Colorado State: Destin Thurman, McKenna Hofschild, Cali Clark, Sydney Mech, Meghan Boyd

MW Net

Nov. 8
6 p.m. MST

Recap

BYU Cougars 62, Colorado State Rams 82
Scoring by quarter: 18–17, 21–18, 13–28, 10–19
Pts: Arielle Mackey-Williams 18; Rebs: Lauren Gustin 13; Asts: Nani Falatea 4	Pts: McKenna Hofschild 18; Rebs: Sydney Mech, Joseana Vaz 6 Asts: McKenna Hofschild 9

Moby Arena
Fort Collins, CO
Attendance: 1,142
Referees: Julie Krommenhoek, Tiffany Bird, Maj Forsberg

=== Montana State ===
Broadcasters: Spencer Linton, Kristen Kozlowski, and Jason Shepherd

Series History: BYU leads series 9–3
Starting Lineups:

- Montana State: Darian White, Kola Bad Bear, Kately Limardo, Leia Beattie, Taylor Janssen
- BYU: Amanda Barcello, Nani Falatea, Arielle Mackey-Williams, Lauren Gustin, Emma Calvert

byutv.org

Nov. 12
2 p.m. MST

Recap

Montana State Bobcats 69, BYU Cougars 60
Scoring by quarter: 12–13, 20–20, 23–15, 14–12
Pts: Darian White 16; Rebs: Darian White 8 Asts: Darian White 4	Pts: Nani Falatea 17; Rebs: Lauren Gustin 12; Asts: Nani Falatea 6

Marriot Center
Provo, UT
Attendance: 1,273
Referees: Brenda Pantoja, Felecity Willis, Amy Krommenhoek

=== Oklahoma ===
Broadcasters: Spencer Linton and Kristen Kozlowski

Series History: Oklahoma leads series 6–1
Starting Lineups:

- Oklahoma: Nevaeh Tot, Ana Llanusa, Madi Williams, Taylor Robertson, Liz Scott
- BYU: Amanda Barcello, Nani Falatea, Kaylee Smiler, Lauren Gustin, Rose Bubakar

byutv.org

Nov. 15
3 p.m. MST

Recap

#16 Oklahoma Sooners 77, BYU Cougars 66
Scoring by quarter: 14–15, 12–19, 26–18, 25–14
Pts: Madi Williams 21; Rebs: Liz Scott 9 Asts: Nevaeh Tot, Ana Llanusa, Taylor Robertson 5	Pts: Lauren Gustin 15; Rebs: Lauren Gustin 20; Asts: Nani Falatea, Kaylee Smiler 5

Marriott Center
Provo, UT
Attendance: 568
Referees: Benny Luna, Tyler Trimble, Teresa Turner

=== Washington State ===
Broadcasters: No commentary

Series History: Series even 6–6
Starting Lineups:

- BYU: Amanda Barcello, Nani Falatea, Kaylee Smiler, Lauren Gustin, Rose Bubakar
- Washington State: Tara Wallack, Charlisse Leger-Walker, Ula Motuga, Johanna Teder, Bella Murekatete

Be the Beast

Nov. 18
3 p.m. HAST

Recap

BYU Cougars 65, Washington State Cougars 56
Scoring by quarter: 18–11, 20–14, 15–12, 14–20
Pts: Nani Falatea 19; Rebs: Lauren Gustin 15; Asts: Nani Falatea, Rose Bubakar 7	Pts: Charlisse Leger-Walker 21; Rebs: Astera Tuhina 4 Asts: Astera Tuhina 4

Cannon Events Center
Laie, HI
Attendance: 509
Referees: Nicole Brannon, Steve Piercy, Travis Jones

=== Troy ===
Broadcasters: No commentary

Series History: First Meeting
Starting Lineups:

- Troy: Makayia Hallmon, Jada Walton, Tai'Sheka Porchia, Ja'Mia Hollings, Sharonica Hartsfield
- BYU: Amanda Barcello, Nani Falatea, Kaylee Smiler, Lauren Gustin, Rose Bubakar

Be the Beast

Nov. 20
3 p.m. HAST

Recap

Troy Trojans 68, BYU Cougars 62
Scoring by quarter: 15–11, 16–13, 16–18, 21–20
Pts: Nia Daniel 17; Rebs: Ja'Mia Hollings 7 Asts: Sharonica Hartsfield 4	Pts: Lauren Gustin, Rose Bubakar 19; Rebs: Lauren Gustin 13; Asts: Lauren Gustin 9

Cannon Events Center
Laie, HI
Attendance: 547
Referees: Nicole Brannon, Steve Piercy, Travis Jones

=== Carroll College ===
Broadcasters: Spencer Linton and Kristen Kozlowski

Series History: First Meeting
Starting Lineups:

- Carroll College: Kyndall Keller, Kamden Hillborn, Sienna Swannack, Jamie Pickens, Maddie Geritz
- BYU: Amanda Barcello, Nani Falatea, Kaylee Smiler, Lauren Gustin, Rose Bubakar

byutv.org

Nov. 23
2:05 p.m. MST

Recap

Carroll College Saints 47, BYU Cougars 71
Scoring by quarter: 8–15, 14–13, 12–26, 13–17
Pts: Jamie Pickens 17; Rebs: Jamie Pickens 6 Asts: Sienna Swannack 4	Pts: Nani Falatea 17; Rebs: Lauren Gustin 10; Asts: Nani Falatea 6

Marriott Center
Provo, UT
Attendance: 1,121
Referees: Tiffany Bird, Kyle Bacon, Teresa Olsen

=== Ball State ===
Broadcasters: Dave McCann and Kristen Kozlowski

Series History: First Meeting
Starting Lineups:

- Ball State: Ally Becki, Thelma Dis Agustsdottir, Marie Kiefer, Madelyn Bischoff, Anna Celphane
- BYU: Amanda Barcello, Nani Falatea, Kaylee Smiler, Lauren Gustin, Rose Bubakar

BYUtv

Nov. 26
2:05 p.m. MST

Recap

Ball State Cardinals 61, BYU Cougars 56
Scoring by quarter: 14–14, 18–21, 16–0, 13–11
Pts: Ally Becki 17; Rebs: Ally Becki, Madelyn Bischoff 5 Asts: Thelma Dis Agustsdottir 4	Pts: Lauren Gustin 18; Rebs: Lauren Gustin 12; Asts: Nani Falatea 5

Marriott Center
Provo, UT
Attendance: 1,038
Referees: Darren Krzesnik, Sha'Rae Mitchell, Kerry Broomfield

=== Boise State ===
Broadcasters: Chris Lewis and Bailey Hawkins

Series History: BYU leads series 12-8
Starting Lineups:

- BYU: Nani Falatea, Kaylee Smiler, Lauren Gustin, Rose Bubakar, Emma Calvert
- Boise State: Mya Hansen, Dani Byes, Mary Kay Naro, Elodie Lalotte, Abby Muse

SCS Pacific

Dec. 1
6:30 p.m. MST

Recap

BYU Cougars 76, Boise State Broncos 67
Scoring by quarter: 20–18, 14–14, 19–15, 23–20
Pts: Lauren Gustin 24; Rebs: Lauren Gustin 17; Asts: Rose Bubakar 3	Pts: Mya Hansen 31; Rebs: Abby Muse 10; Asts: Mandy Simpson 4

ExtraMile Arena
Boise, ID
Attendance: 969
Referees: Benny Luna, Mollie Kaye Mueller, Rigo Vasquez

=== Utah State ===
Broadcasters: Ajay Salvesen and Jake Ellis

Series History: BYU leads series 39–4
Starting Lineups:

- BYU: Nani Falatea, Arielle Mackey-Williams, Lauren Gustin, Rose Bubakar, Emma Calvert
- Utah State: Tamiah Robinson, Maria Carvalho, Olivia Wikstrom, Mayson Kimball, Ashya Klopfenstein

SCS Pacific

Dec. 6
11 a.m. MST

Recap

BYU Cougars 64, Utah State Aggies 54
Scoring by quarter: 13–9, 21–11, 19–21, 11–13
Pts: Rose Bubakar 15; Rebs: Lauren Gustin 9 Asts: Nani Falatea 7	Pts: Mayson Kimball 14; Rebs: Mayson Kimball 5 Asts: Tamiah Robinson 5

Dee Glen Smith Spectrum
Logan, UT
Attendance: 2,713
Referees: Michael Price, Brian Woods, Cheryll Blue

=== Utah ===
Broadcasters: Spencer Linton, Kristen Kozlowski, and Jason Shepherd

Series History: Utah leads series 67-42
Starting Lineups:

- Utah: Ines Vieira, Gianna Kneepkens, Jenna Johnson, Kennady McQueen, Alissa Pili
- BYU: Nani Falatea, Kaylee Smiler, Lauren Gustin, Rose Bubakar, Emma Calvert

BYUtv

Dec. 10
5:05 p.m. MST

Recap

#15 Utah Utes 76, BYU Cougars 59
Scoring by quarter: 18–10, 21–17, 20–16, 17–16
Pts: Alissa Pili 28; Rebs: Alissa Pili 7 Asts: Ines Vieira, Jenna Johnson, Kennady McQueen 3	Pts: Nani Falatea, Lauren Gustin 18; Rebs: Lauren Gustin 15; Asts: Nani Falatea 6

Marriott Center
Provo, UT
Attendance: 2,326
Referees: Brenda Pantoja, Corey Long, Steve Belnap

=== Gonzaga ===
Broadcasters: Greg Heister and Stephanie Hawk-Freeman

Series History: Gonzaga leads series 19–16
Starting Lineups:

- BYU: Nani Falatea, Kaylee Smiler, Lauren Gustin, Rose Bubakar, Emma Calvert
- Gonzaga: Eliza Hollingsworth, Kaylynne Truong, Yvonne Ejim, Brynna Maxwell, McKayla Williams

SWX

Dec. 17
2:05 p.m. PST

Recap

BYU Cougars 58, #23 Gonzaga Bulldogs 67
Scoring by quarter: 14–18, 18–11, 15–21, 11–17
Pts: Lauren Gustin 20; Rebs: Lauren Gustin 13; Asts: Nani Falatea, Lauren Gustin 3	Pts: Kaylynne Truong 24; Rebs: Yvonne Ejim 7 Asts: Kaylynne Truong 4

McCarthey Athletic Center
Spokane, WA
Attendance: 5,037
Referees: Charles Gonzalez, Ashley Ellis, Deon Lewis

=== Portland ===
Broadcasters: Ann Schatz and Jennifer Mountain

Series History: BYU leads series 27–6
Starting Lineups:

- BYU: Nani Falatea, Kaylee Smiler, Lauren Gustin, Rose Bubakar, Emma Calvert
- Portland: Emme Shearer, Haylee Andrews, Alex Fowler, Liana Kaitu'u, Maisie Burnham

SCS Pacific

Dec. 19
6:06 p.m. PST

Recap

BYU Cougars 45, Portland Pilots 67
Scoring by quarter: 10–14, 11—18, 10–20, 14–15
Pts: Emma Calvert 13; Rebs: Lauren Gustin 12; Asts: Nani Falatea 3	Pts: Alex Fowler 18; Rebs: Haylee Andrews 8 Asts: Haylee Andrews 8

Chiles Center
Portland, OR
Attendance: 448
Referees: Lisa Jones, Brian Woods, Marc Merritt

=== Monmouth ===
Broadcasters: Spencer Linton, Kristen Kozlowski, and Jason Shepherd

Series History: First Meeting
Starting Lineups:

- Monmouth: Ariana Vanderhoop, Kaci Donovan, Brianna Tinsley, Elizabeth Marsicano, Belle Kranbuhl
- BYU: Nani Falatea, Kaylee Smiler, Lauren Gustin, Rose Bubakar, Emma Calvert

byutv.org

Dec. 21
1:05 p.m. MST

Recap

Monmouth Hawks 50, BYU Cougars 70
Scoring by quarter: 14–13, 9–19, 14–24, 13–14
Pts: Brianna Tinsley 18; Rebs: Brianna Tinsley 5 Asts: Arianna Vanderhoop, Antonia Panayides 3	Pts: Arielle Mackey-Williams 15; Rebs: Lauren Gustin 23; Asts: Nani Falatea 8

Marriott Center
Provo, UT
Attendance: 653
Referees: Melissa Barlow, Tyler Trimble, Katie Bossenmaier

=== Pacific ===
Broadcasters: Spencer Linton and Kristen Kozlowski

Series History: BYU leads series 19–4
Starting Lineups:

- Pacific: Anaya James, Cecilia Holmberg, Elizabeth Elliott, Erica Adams, Sam Ashby
- BYU: Nani Falatea, Arielle Mackey-Williams, Kaylee Smiler, Lauren Gustin, Emma Calvert

BYUtv

Dec. 29
7:05 p.m. MST

Recap

Pacific Tigers 51, BYU Cougars 69
Scoring by quarter: 9–18, 15–19, 11–13, 16–19
Pts: Kadie Deaton 14; Rebs: Anaya James, Elizabeth Elliott 5 Asts: Anaya James 3	Pts: Lauren Gustin 21; Rebs: Lauren Gustin 22; Asts: Nani Falatea 7

Marriott Center
Provo, UT
Attendance: 1,242
Referees: Anita Ortega, Sean Martin, Teresa Olsen

=== Saint Mary's ===
Broadcasters: Spencer Linton, Kristen Kozlowski, and Jason Shepherd

Series History: BYU leads series 15-10
Starting Lineups:

- Saint Mary's: Taycee Wedin, Tayla Dalton, Hannah Rapp, Aspen Garrison, Ali Bamberger
- BYU: Nani Falatea, Arielle Mackey-Williams, Kaylee Smiler, Lauren Gustin, Emma Calvert

byutv.org

Dec. 31
2:05 p.m. MST

Recap

Saint Mary's Gaels 41, BYU Cougars 66
Scoring by quarter: 9–14, 10–23, 11–16, 11–13
Pts: Taycee Wedin 10; Rebs: Leia Hanafin 4 Asts: Taycee Wedin, Hannah Rapp, Jade Kirisome 2	Pts: Nani Falatea 24; Rebs: Lauren Gustin 16; Asts: Nani Falatea 7

Marriott Center
Provo, UT
Attendance: 1,465
Referees: Michol Murray, Lauren Ahumada, Matthew Head

=== San Diego ===
Broadcasters: Spencer Linton, Kristen Kozlowski, & Jason Shepherd

Series History: BYU leads series 15–8
Starting Lineups:

- San Diego: Kiera Oakry, Ayanna Khalfani, Kasey Neubert, Kylie Horstmeyer, Amanda Olinger
- BYU: Nani Falatea, Arielle Mackey-Williams, Kaylee Smiler, Lauren Gustin, Emma Calvert

BYUtv

Jan. 7
2:05 p.m. MST

Recap

San Diego Toreros 49, BYU Cougars 63
Scoring by quarter: 7–18, 14–14, 14–15, 14–16
Pts: Kiera Oakry 11; Rebs: Kylie Horstmeyer 6 Asts: Laura Erikstrup 3	Pts: Lauren Gustin 21; Rebs: Lauren Gustin 24; Asts: Nani Falatea 5

Marriott Center
Provo, UT
Attendance: 1,346
Referees: Kyle Bacon, Cheryll Blue, Felicity Willis

=== Loyola Marymount ===
Broadcasters: Brendan Craig & Gary Craig

Series History: BYU leads series 21-2
Starting Lineups:

- BYU: Nani Flatea, Arielle Mackey-Williams, Kaylee Smiler, Lauren Gustin, Emma Calvert
- Loyola Marymount: Nicole Rodriguez, Cassandra Gordon, Ariel Johnson, Khari Clark, Alexis Mark

SCS Central

Jan. 12
7 p.m. PST

Recap

BYU Cougars 63, Loyola Marymount Lions 46
Scoring by quarter: 22–2, 16–9, 17–14, 8–21
Pts: Nani Falatea, Arielle Mackey-Williams 12; Rebs: Lauren Gustin 24; Asts: Kaylee Smiler 8	Pts: Alexis Mark 17; Rebs: Alexis Mark 8 Asts: Alexis Mark 4

Gersten Pavilion
Los Angeles, CA
Attendance: 208
Referees: Charles Gonzalez, Rochelle Bennett, Esther Hsu

=== Pepperdine ===
Broadcasters: Darren Preston

Series History: BYU leads series 24–4
Starting Lineups:

- BYU: Nani Falatea, Arielle Mackey-Williams, Kaylee Smiler, Lauren Gustin, Emma Calvert
- Pepperdine: Jane Nwaba, Helena Friend, Marly Walls, Meaali'i Amosa, Becky Obinma

SCS Atlantic

Jan. 14
2 p.m. PST

Recap

BYU Cougars 63, Pepperdine Waves 52
Scoring by quarter: 14–12, 16–8, 20–15, 13–17
Pts: Nani Falatea 16; Rebs: Lauren Gustin 20; Asts: Nani Flatea, Arielle Mackey-Williams 2	Pts: Jane Nwaba 15; Rebs: Marly Walls 8 Asts: Marly Walls 6

Firestone Fieldhouse
Malibu, CA
Attendance: 147
Referees: Michael Price, Kaili Kimura, Brad Schmidt

=== San Francisco ===
Broadcasters: Spencer Linton, Kristen Kozlowski, & Jason Shepherd

Series History: BYU leads series 24-7
Starting Lineups:

- San Francisco: Kia Vaalavirta, Jessica McDowell-White, Kennedy Dickie, Ioanna Krimili, Abby Rathbun
- BYU: Nani Falatea, Arielle Mackey-Williams, Kaylee Smiler, Lauren Gustin, Emma Calvert

BYUtv

Jan. 19
11:05 a.m. MST

Recap

San Francisco Dons 59, BYU Cougars 78
Scoring by quarter: 15–20, 15–22, 15–19, 14–17
Pts: Kennedy Dickie 14; Rebs: Kennedy Dickie 4 Asts: Jessica McDowell-White 4	Pts: Lauren Gustin 27; Rebs: Lauren Gustin 19; Asts: Nani Falatea, Arielle Mackey-Williams 6

Marriott Center
Provo, UT
Attendance: 8,758
Referees: Melissa Barlow, Sydney Mott, Johnny Mendez

=== Santa Clara ===
Broadcasters: Jason Shepherd & Kristen Kozlowski

Series History: BYU leads series 23–2
Starting Lineups:

- Santa Clara: Ashlee Maldonado, Lara Edmanson, Marya Hudgins, Ashley Hiraki, Tess Heal
- BYU: Nani Falatea, Arielle Mackey-Williams, Kaylee Smiler, Lauren Gustin, Emma Calvert

BYUtv

Jan. 21
2:05 p.m. MST

Recap

Santa Clara Broncos 69, BYU Cougars 59
Scoring by quarter: 20–16, 15–20, 17–7, 17–16
Pts: Ashley Hiraki, Tess Heal 13; Rebs: Ashley Hiraki 9 Asts: Tess Heal 7	Pts: Nani Falatea 20; Rebs: Lauren Gustin 15; Asts: Arielle Mackey-Williams 5

Marriott Center
Provo, UT
Attendance: 1,438
Referees: Tyler Trimble, Sean Martin, Amy Krommenhoek

=== Saint Mary's ===
Broadcasters: Evan Giddings & Joaquin Wallace

Series History: BYU leads series 16–10
Starting Lineups:

- BYU:
- Saint Mary's:

SCS Atlantic

Jan. 26
PST

BYU Cougars vs. Saint Mary's Gaels

University Credit Union Pavilion
Moraga, CA

=== Pacific ===
Broadcasters:

Series History: BYU leads series 20–4
Starting Lineups:

- Pacific:
- BYU:

WCC Net

Jan. 28
PST

BYU Cougars vs. Pacific Tigers

Alex G. Spanos Center
Stockton, CA

=== San Diego ===
Broadcasters:

Series History: BYU leads series
Starting Lineups:

- BYU:
- San Diego:

Feb. 4
MST

BYU Cougars vs. San Diego Toreros

Jenny Craig Pavilion
San Diego, CA

=== Pepperdine ===
Broadcasters:

Series History: BYU leads series
Starting Lineups:

- Pepperdine:
- BYU:

Feb. 9
PST

BYU Cougars vs. Pepperdine Waves

Marriott Center
Provo, UT

=== Loyola Marymount ===
Broadcasters:

Series History: BYU leads series
Starting Lineups:

- Loyola Marymount:
- BYU:

Feb. 11
MST

Loyola Marymount Lions vs. BYU Cougars

Marriott Center
Provo, UT

=== Santa Clara ===
Broadcasters:

Series History: BYU leads series
Starting Lineups:

- BYU:
- Santa Clara:

Feb. 16
PST

BYU Cougars vs. Santa Clara Broncos

Leavey Center
Santa Clara, CA

=== San Francisco ===
Broadcasters:

Series History: BYU leads series
Starting Lineups:

- BYU:
- San Francisco:

Feb. 18
PST

BYU Cougars vs. San Francisco Dons

The Sobrato Center
San Francisco, CA

=== Portland ===
Broadcasters:

Series History: BYU leads series 27–7
Starting Lineups:

- Portland:
- BYU:

Feb. 23
MST

Portland Pilots vs. BYU Cougars

Marriott Center
Provo, UT

=== Gonzaga ===
Broadcasters:

Series History: Gonzaga leads series 20–16
Starting Lineups:

- Gonzaga:
- BYU:

Feb. 25
MST

Gonzaga Bulldogs vs. BYU Cougars

Marriott Center
Provo, UT

== Conference Honors ==
- Conference honors will be filled in once they announce preseason and postseason information,

== Rankings ==
+ Regular season polls	Poll	Pre- Season	Week 1	Week 2	Week 3	Week 4	Week 5	Week 6	Week 7	Week 8	Week 9	Week 10	Week 11	Week 12	Week 13	Week 14	Week 15	Week 16	Week 17	Week 18	Final
AP	RV																				
Coaches	RV																				

Legend
	Increase in ranking
	Decrease in ranking
	No change
(RV)	Received votes
(NR)	Not ranked

^The Coaches poll did not release a week 1 ranking.
