= 2022–23 Portland Pilots women's basketball team =

American college basketball season

2022–23 Portland Pilots women's basketball
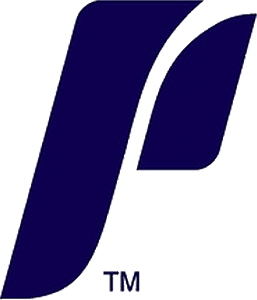

St. Pete Showcase champions WCC tournament champions

NCAA tournament, first round
- Conference: West Coast Conference
- Record: 23–9 (15–3 WCC)
- Head coach: Michael Meek (4th season)
- Assistant coaches: Tom Batsell; Skyler Young; Sharon Rissmiller
- Home arena: Chiles Center

2022–23 West Coast Conference women's basketball standings
	Conf.				Overall
Team	W		L	PCT	W		L	PCT
No. 19 Gonzaga	17	–	1	.944	28	–	5	.848
Portland†	15	–	3	.833	23	–	9	.719
San Diego	11	–	7	.611	19	–	14	.576
BYU	9	–	9	.500	16	–	17	.485
San Francisco	9	–	9	.500	19	–	13	.594
Pacific	8	–	10	.444	15	–	17	.469
Saint Mary's	6	–	12	.333	13	–	18	.419
Santa Clara	6	–	12	.333	15	–	17	.469
Pepperdine	5	–	13	.278	11	–	19	.367
Loyola Marymount	4	–	14	.222	7	–	23	.233
† 2023 WCC tournament winner As of March 24, 2023; Rankings from AP poll

The 2022–23 Portland Pilots women's basketball team represented the University of Portland in the 2022–23 NCAA Division I women's basketball season. The Pilots were led by fourth-year coach Michael Meek. They played their homes games at Chiles Center and were members of the West Coast Conference (WCC).

== Previous season ==
The Pilots finished the season at 20–11 and 8–7 in WCC play, to finish in fourth place. They defeated in the quarterfinals WCC women's tournament to Loyola Marymount before losing to BYU in the semifinals. They received an at-large bid to the WNIT, where they defeated Colorado State in the first round before losing to Oregon State in the second round.

== Offseason ==
=== Departures ===
Due to COVID-19 disruptions throughout NCAA sports in 2020–21, the NCAA announced that the 2020–21 season would not count against the athletic eligibility of any individual involved in an NCAA winter sport, including women's basketball. This meant that all seniors in 2020–21 had the option to return for 2021–22.

Portland departures
Name	Num	Pos.	Height	Year	Hometown	Reason for departure
Rose Pflug	2	G	5'10"	(redshirt) Junior	Portland, OR	TBD
Camryn Collman	3	G	5'10"	Freshman	La Grande, OR	Transferred to Idaho State
Maddie Muhlheim	15	G	5'8"	Senior	Portland, OR	Graduated

==== Recruiting ====
There was no recruiting class of 2022.

== Roster ==
2022–23 Portland Pilots women's basketball team
Players
Coaches

Pos.	#	Name	Height	Year	Previous school	Hometown
G	1	McKelle Meek	5 ft 7 in (1.7 m)	So	Southridge HS	Beaverton, OR
F	2	Keeley Frawley	6 ft 0 in (1.83 m)	Jr	Haileybury	Melbourne, Australia
G	3	Florence Dallow	6 ft 0 in (1.83 m)	Fr	Epsom Girls'	Beaverton, OR
G	4	Melika Samia	5 ft 9 in (1.75 m)	Fr	Mount Maunganui College	Napier, New Zealand
G	5	Emme Shearer	6 ft 0 in (1.83 m)	Fr	Mount Maunganui College	Auckland, New Zealand
G	10	Haylee Andrews	5 ft 9 in (1.75 m)	Sr	Townsville State HS	Townsville, Australia
G	11	Emma Strelein	5 ft 11 in (1.8 m)	RS Fr	Kennedy Baptist	Perth, Australia
F	12	Alex Fowler	6 ft 2 in (1.88 m)	Jr	St Margaret Mary's College	Townsville, Australia
G	14	Chance Bucher	5 ft 8 in (1.73 m)	So	Pinewood School	Half Moon Bay, CA
F	21	Emily Sewell	6 ft 3 in (1.91 m)	So	Centre of Excellence	Melbourne, Australia
G	22	MJ Bruno	6 ft 0 in (1.83 m)	So	Central Valley HS	Spokane, WA
F	23	Liana Kaitu'u	6 ft 0 in (1.83 m)	RS Jr	East HS	Salt Lake City, UT
G	24	Maisie Burnham	6 ft 0 in (1.83 m)	So	Liberty HS; Eastern Washington	Spangle, WA
F	30	Lucy Cochrane	6 ft 5 in (1.96 m)	Jr	Catholic Ladies College; Oregon	Melbourne, Australia
G	32	Kelsey Lenzie	5 ft 7 in (1.7 m)	Jr	West Seattle HS	Seattle, WA
C	34	Maddi Condron	6 ft 7 in (2.01 m)	Jr	Braemar College	Woodend, Australia

Head coach

- Michael Meek (Eastern Oregon)

Assistant coach(es)

- Tom Batsell (Pacific)
- Skyler Young (Western Michigan)
- Sharon Rissmiller (Portland)

Legend

- (C) Team captain
- (S) Suspended
- (I) Ineligible
- (W) Walk-on
- Injured
- Current redshirt

Roster
Last update: July 12, 2024

== Schedule and results ==
Date time, TV	Rank^{#}	Opponent^{#}	Result	Record	High points	High rebounds	High assists	Site (attendance) city, state
Exhibition
November 2, 2022*; 6:00 p.m.		Warner Pacific	W 94–45		17 – tied	6 – Shearer	7 – Meek	Chiles Center (261); Portland, OR
Non-conference regular season
November 7, 2022*; 5:00 p.m.		Willamette	W 92–56	1–0	20 – Kaitu'u	9 – Burnham	6 – Shearer	Chiles Center (294); Portland, OR
November 9, 2022*; 5:00 p.m.		Hawaii	W 70–54	2–0	22 – Burnham	6 – Fowler	9 – Fowler	Chiles Center (492); Portland, OR
November 13, 2022*; 2:00 p.m., ESPN2		No. 2 Stanford	L 47–87	2–1	13 – Kaitu'u	6 – Burnham	3 – Fowler	Chiles Center (2,047); Portland, OR
November 18, 2022*; 6:00 p.m.		at San Diego State	L 53–55	2–2	14 – Fowler	11 – Cochrane	7 – Meek	Viejas Arena (1,490); San Diego, CA
November 20, 2022*; 7:00 p.m., ESPN+		at UC San Diego	L 76–85	2–3	16 – Fowler	8 – Shearer	3 – Fowler	LionTree Arena (312); San Diego, CA
November 24, 2022*; 2:30 p.m., FloSports		vs. Houston; St. Pete Showcase	W 66–60	3–3	20 – Fowler	8 – Cochrane	4 – Cochrane	McArthur Gymnasium (115); St. Petersburg, FL
November 26, 2022*; 11:00 a.m., FloSports		vs. Northeastern; St. Pete Showcase	W 67–41	4–3	14 – Fowler	9 – Burnham	5 – Cochrane	McArthur Gymnasium (128); St. Petersburg, FL
November 30, 2022*; 11:00 a.m.		Evergreen State	W 87–35	5–3	16 – Fowler	6 – Fowler	6 – Meek	Chiles Center (881); Portland, OR
December 3, 2022*; 2:00 p.m., P12N		at No. 19 Oregon	L 51–90	5–4	19 – Fowler	5 – Cochrane	4 – Andrews	Matthew Knight Arena (5,892); Eugene, OR
December 7, 2022*; 6:00 p.m., KRCW		Washington State	L 63–69	5–5	15 – Fowler	6 – tied	4 – Meek	Chiles Center (519); Portland, OR
December 10, 2022*; 3:00 p.m., KRCW		Portland State	W 71–56	6–5	27 – Fowler	9 – Fowler	4 – Andrews	Chiles Center (307); Portland, OR
WCC regular season
December 17, 2022; 5:00 p.m.		San Diego	W 84–81	7–5 (1–0)	19 – tied	7 – Frawley	6 – Andrews	Chiles Center (458); Portland, OR
December 19, 2022; 6:00 p.m., KRCW		BYU	W 67–45	8–5 (2–0)	18 – Fowler	8 – Andrews	8 – Andrews	Chiles Center (448); Portland, OR
December 29, 2022; 7:00 p.m.		at Loyola Marymount	W 70–61	9–5 (3–0)	24 – Fowler	5 – tied	9 – Andrews	Gersten Pavilion (408); Los Angeles, CA
December 31, 2022; 1:00 p.m.		at Pepperdine	W 86–76	10–5 (4–0)	21 – Burnham	7 – Fowler	9 – Andrews	Firestone Fieldhouse (176); Malibu, CA
January 5, 2023; 6:00 p.m., KRCW		Santa Clara	W 81–71	11–5 (5–0)	26 – Fowler	8 – Andrews	6 – tied	Chiles Center (303); Portland, OR
January 7, 2022; 5:00 p.m.		San Francisco	W 77–46	12–5 (6–0)	21 – Shearer	8 – Fowler	14 – Andrews	Chiles Center (888); Portland, OR
January 14, 2023; 5:00 p.m., KRCW		No. 20 Gonzaga	L 66–73	12–6 (6–1)	27 – Andrews	6 – Andrews	5 – Fowler	Chiles Center (1,167); Portland, OR
January 19, 2023; 6:30 p.m.		at Saint Mary's	W 64–41	13–6 (7–1)	18 – Fowler	6 – tied	5 – Meek	University Credit Union Pavilion (272); Moraga, CA
January 21, 2023; 2:00 p.m.		at Pacific	W 81–67	14–6 (8–1)	20 – tied	9 – Shearer	5 – Frawley	Alex G. Spanos Center (325); Stockton, CA
January 26, 2023; 6:00 p.m., KRCW		Pepperdine	W 70–57	15–6 (9–1)	26 – Fowler	5 – tied	4 – Meek	Chiles Center (463); Portland, OR
January 28, 2023; 7:00 p.m.		Loyola Marymount	W 58–39	16–6 (10–1)	12 – Shearer	10 – Shearer	4 – Fowler	Chiles Center (633); Portland, OR
February 2, 2023; 6:00 p.m.		at San Francisco	W 83–80 ^{OT}	17–6 (11–1)	23 – Fowler	9 – tied	5 – Meek	War Memorial Gymnasium; San Francisco, CA
February 4, 2023; 2:00 p.m.		at Santa Clara	W 80–68	18–6 (12–1)	26 – Fowler	6 – Fowler	5 – Shearer	Leavey Center (1,002); Santa Clara, CA
February 11, 2023; 1:00 p.m., RTNW		at No. 23 Gonzaga	L 53–63	18–7 (12–2)	13 – tied	9 – Fowler	5 – Meek	McCarthey Athletic Center (6,000); Spokane, WA
February 16, 2023; 6:00 p.m., KRCW		Saint Mary's	W 77–66	19–7 (13–2)	29 – Burnham	8 – Cochrane	5 – Meek	Chiles Center (736); Portland, OR
February 18, 2023; 3:00 p.m.		Pacific	W 57–46	20–7 (14–2)	12 – tied	8 – Frawley	4 – Meek	Chiles Center (1,159); Portland, OR
February 25, 2023; 2:00 p.m.		at San Diego	L 58–74	20–8 (14–3)	15 – Fowler	7 – Frawley	15 – Fowler	Jenny Craig Pavilion (301); San Diego, CA
February 27, 2023; 4:00 p.m., BYUtv		at BYU; Rescheduled from February 23	W 61–49	21–8 (15–3)	17 – Kaitu'u	6 – tied	5 – Fowler	Marriott Center (815); Provo, UT
WCC women's tournament
March 6, 2023; 2:30 p.m., RTNW/BYUtv	(2)	vs. (6) Pacific; Semifinals	W 75–72	22–8	29 – Fowler	6 – Fowler	6 – Meek	Orleans Arena; Paradise, NV
March 7, 2023; 1:00 p.m., ESPNU	(2)	vs. (1) No. 16 Gonzaga; Championship	W 64–60	23–8	19 – Burnham	11 – Fowler	5 – Cochrane	Orleans Arena; Paradise, NV
NCAA tournament
March 18, 2023*; 6:00 p.m., ESPNU	(12 G1)	vs. (5 G1) No. 16 Oklahoma; First round	L 63–85	23–9	18 – Fowler	7 – Fowler	3 – tied	Pauley Pavilion; Los Angeles, CA
*Non-conference game. ^{#}Rankings from AP poll. (#) Tournament seedings in parentheses. G1=Greenville 1. All times are in Pacific.

== See also ==
- 2022–23 Portland Pilots men's basketball team
