= 2023 West Coast Conference women's basketball tournament =

- Classification: Division I
- Season: 2022–23
- Teams: 10
- Site: Orleans Arena; Paradise, Nevada
- Champions: Portland (3rd title)
- Winning coach: Michael Meek (2nd title)
- Television: WCC Network, BYUtv, ESPNU

2022–23 West Coast Conference women's basketball standings
	Conf.				Overall
Team	W		L	PCT	W		L	PCT
No. 19 Gonzaga	17	–	1	.944	28	–	5	.848
Portland†	15	–	3	.833	23	–	9	.719
San Diego	11	–	7	.611	19	–	14	.576
BYU	9	–	9	.500	16	–	17	.485
San Francisco	9	–	9	.500	19	–	13	.594
Pacific	8	–	10	.444	15	–	17	.469
Saint Mary's	6	–	12	.333	13	–	18	.419
Santa Clara	6	–	12	.333	15	–	17	.469
Pepperdine	5	–	13	.278	11	–	19	.367
Loyola Marymount	4	–	14	.222	7	–	23	.233
† 2023 WCC tournament winner As of March 24, 2023; Rankings from AP poll

The 2023 West Coast Conference women's basketball Tournament is the postseason women's basketball tournament for the West Coast Conference for the 2022–23 season. All tournament games will be played at Orleans Arena in the Las Vegas-area community of Paradise, Nevada, from March 2–7, 2023.

== Seeds ==
All ten conference teams participate in the tournament. Teams are seeded by record within the conference, with a tiebreaker system to seed teams with identical conference records. The tiebreakers operate in the following order:

1. Head-to-head record
2. Record against the top-seeded team not involved in the tie, going down through the standings until the tie is broken
3. NET rating after the final regular-season conference games on February 25

Seed	School	Conf. record	Tiebreaker(s)
1	Gonzaga	17-1	
2	Portland	15-3	
3	San Diego	11–7	
4	San Francisco	9–9	2-0 vs. San Diego
5	BYU	9-9	1-1 vs. San Diego
6	Pacific	8-10	
7	Saint Mary's	6-12	2-0 vs. Santa Clara
8	Santa Clara	6-12	0-2 vs. Saint Mary's
9	Pepperdine	5-13	
10	Loyola Marymount	4-14	

== Schedule and results ==
Game	Time	Matchup	Score	Television
First Round - Thursday, March 2
1	12:00 pm	No. 8 Santa Clara vs. No. 9 Pepperdine	60–63	WCC Network, BYUtv, RSN
2	2:30 pm	No. 7 Saint Mary's vs. No. 10 Loyola Marymount	74–43	WCC Network, BYUtv, RSN
Second Round - Friday, March 3
3	12:00 pm	No. 5 BYU vs. No. 9 Pepperdine	74–59	WCC Network, BYUtv, RSN
4	2:30 pm	No. 6 Pacific vs. No. 7 Saint Mary's	82–77	WCC Network, BYUtv, RSN
Quarterfinals – Saturday, March 4
5	1:00 pm	No. 4 San Francisco vs. No. 5 BYU	56–66	WCC Network, BYUtv, RSN
6	3:30 pm	No. 3 San Diego vs. No. 6 Pacific	57–71	WCC Network, BYUtv, RSN
Semifinals - Monday, March 6
7	12:00 pm	No. 1 Gonzaga vs. No. 5 BYU	79–64	WCC Network, BYUtv, RSN
8	2:30 pm	No. 2 Portland vs. No. 6 Pacific	75–72	WCC Network, BYUtv, RSN
Final – Tuesday, March 7
9	6:00 pm	No. 1 Gonzaga vs. No. 2 Portland	60-64	ESPNU
*Game times in PST. Rankings denote tournament seed. Reference:

== Bracket ==
First round Thursday, March 2
8	Santa Clara	60
9	Pepperdine	63
7	Saint Mary's	74
10	Loyola Marymount	43

Second round Friday, March 3
5	BYU	74
9	Pepperdine	59
6	Pacific	82
7	Saint Mary's	77

Third round Saturday, March 4
4	San Francisco	56
5	BYU	66
3	San Diego	57
6	Pacific	71

Semifinals; Monday, March 6
1	Gonzaga	79
5	BYU	64
2	Portland	75
6	Pacific	72

Championship; Tuesday, March 7
1	Gonzaga	60
2	Portland	64

* denotes overtime period
