= 2022–23 Stanford Cardinal women's basketball team =

American college basketball season

2022–23 Stanford Cardinal women's basketball

Pac-12 regular season co-champions

NCAA tournament, Second Round
- Conference: Pac-12 Conference

Ranking
- Coaches: No. 10
- AP: No. 5
- Record: 29–6 (15–3 Pac-12)
- Head coach: Tara VanDerveer (37th season)
- Associate head coach: Kate Paye (16th season)
- Assistant coaches: Katy Steding (3rd season); Britney Anderson (3rd season)
- Home arena: Maples Pavilion

2022–23 Pac-12 Conference women's basketball standings
	Conf.				Overall
Team	W		L	PCT	W		L	PCT
No. 8 Utah	15	–	3	.833	27	–	5	.844
No. 5 Stanford	15	–	3	.833	29	–	6	.829
No. 21 Colorado	13	–	5	.722	25	–	9	.735
No. 14 UCLA	11	–	7	.611	27	–	10	.730
No. 25 Arizona	11	–	7	.611	22	–	10	.688
USC	11	–	7	.611	21	–	10	.677
No. 23 Washington State †	9	–	9	.500	23	–	11	.676
Oregon	7	–	11	.389	20	–	15	.571
Washington	7	–	11	.389	19	–	15	.559
California	4	–	14	.222	13	–	17	.433
Oregon State	4	–	14	.222	13	–	18	.419
Arizona State	1	–	17	.056	8	–	20	.286
† 2023 Pac-12 Tournament winner Rankings from AP poll

The 2022–23 Stanford Cardinal women's basketball team represented Stanford University during the 2022–23 NCAA Division I women's basketball season. The Cardinal were led by thirty-seventh year head coach Tara VanDerveer, and they played their home games at Maples Pavilion as members of the Pac-12 Conference.

The team's win over Sacred Heart marked the end of losing streak to Mid Major New England teams, the streak began back in 1998 when they lost to Harvard to become the only number 1 seed to be upset and in 1999 when they lost to Maine in the first round.

== Offseason ==
Due to COVID-19, the NCAA ruled in October 2020 that the 2020–21 season would not count against the eligibility of any basketball player, thus giving all players the option to return in 2021–22. Additionally, any players who have declared for the 2022 WNBA draft—including seniors, who must opt into this year's draft—have the option to return if they make a timely withdrawal from the draft and end any pre-draft relationships with agents. Thus, separate lists will initially be maintained for confirmed and potential departures.

=== Team departures ===
Name	Number	Pos.	Height	Year	Hometown	Reason for departure
Anna Wilson	#3	G	5'7"	GS	Seattle, WA	Graduated
Alyssa Jerome	#10	F	6'3"	GS	Toronto, ON, Canada	Graduated
Lexie Hull	#12	G	6'1"	Senior	Spokane, WA	Graduated/2022 WNBA draft; Selected 6th overall by the Indiana Fever
Jordan Hamilton	#14	G	5'8"	GS	Liberty, TX	Graduated
Lacie Hull	#24	G	6'1"	Senior	Spokane, WA	Graduated

==== Outgoing transfers ====
Stanford outgoing transfers
Name	Number	Pos.	Height	Year	Hometown	New School	Source
Jana Van Gytenbeek	#4	G	5'7"	Sophomore	Greenwood Village, CO	Baylor	
Jenna Brown	#54	G	5'10"	RS Junior	Atlanta, GA	Notre Dame	

=== Acquisitions ===
==== Recruiting ====
College recruiting
Name	Hometown	School	Height	Weight	Commit date
Lauren Betts; P	Centennial, Colorado	Grandview High School	6 ft 7 in (2.01 m)	N/A	
Lauren Betts; P	Recruit ratings: ESPN: (98)				
Indya Nivar; G	Apex, North Carolina	Apex Friendship High School	5 ft 9 in (1.75 m)	N/A	
Indya Nivar; G	Recruit ratings: ESPN: (96)				
Talana Lepolo; PG	Concord, California	Carondelet High School	5 ft 7 in (1.70 m)	N/A	
Talana Lepolo; PG	Recruit ratings: ESPN: (93)				
Overall recruit ranking:
Note: In many cases, Scout, Rivals, 247Sports, On3, and ESPN may conflict in their listings of height and weight.; In these cases, the average was taken. ESPN grades are on a 100-point scale.; Sources: "2022 Player Commits". ESPN. Archived from the original on September 7, 2021.

===== Recruiting class of 2023 =====
College recruiting (2023)
Name	Hometown	School	Height	Weight	Commit date
Courtney Ogden; PG	Atlanta, Georgia	Westminster School	5 ft 11 in (1.80 m)	N/A	
Courtney Ogden; PG	Recruit ratings: ESPN: (96)				
Sunaja Agara; G	Minnetonka, MN	Hopkins High School	5 ft 11 in (1.80 m)	N/A	
Sunaja Agara; G	Recruit ratings: ESPN: (95)				
Chloe Clardy; G	Conway, AR	Conway High School	5 ft 9 in (1.75 m)	N/A	
Chloe Clardy; G	Recruit ratings: ESPN: (94)				
Overall recruit ranking:
Note: In many cases, Scout, Rivals, 247Sports, On3, and ESPN may conflict in their listings of height and weight.; In these cases, the average was taken. ESPN grades are on a 100-point scale.; Sources: "2023 Player Commits". ESPN. Archived from the original on December 6, 2021.

=== 2022 WNBA draft ===
Round	Pick	Player	Position	WNBA Team	Source
1	6th	Lexie Hull	SG	Indiana Fever	

== Preseason ==
=== Preseason rankings ===
Pac-12 media poll
Predicted finish	Team	Votes (1st place)
1	Stanford	121 (11)
2	Oregon	101
3	Arizona	100
4	UCLA	91
5	Utah	84 (1)
6	Oregon State	62
7	Washington State	61
8	Colorado	55
9	USC	50
10	Washington	28
11	California	21
12	Arizona State	18

Pac-12 media poll (Media)
Predicted finish	Team	Votes (1st place)
1	Stanford	336 (28)
2	Arizona	291
3	Oregon	275
4	UCLA	237
5	Utah	226
6	Oregon State	181
7	Washington State	170
8	Colorado	145
9	USC	105
10	Washington	78
11	California	71
12	Arizona State	69

=== Preseason All-Pac-12 teams ===
Award	Player	Position	Year
Preseason All Pac-12 team	Cameron Brink	F	Jr.
Preseason All Pac-12 team	Haley Jones	G	Sr.

=== Award watch lists ===
Listed in the order that they were released

Award	Player	Position	Year	Source
Cheryl Miller Award	Haley Jones	G	Sr.	
Katrina McClain Award	Cameron Brink	F	Jr.	
Lisa Leslie Award	Francesa Belibi	C	Sr.	
Lisa Leslie Award	Lauren Betts	C	Fr.	
Naismith Trophy	Haley Jones	G	Sr.	
Naismith Trophy	Cameron Brink	F	Jr.	
Wooden Award	Haley Jones	G	Sr.	
Wooden Award	Cameron Brink	F	Jr.	
Wade Trophy	Haley Jones	G	Sr.	
Wade Trophy	Cameron Brink	F	Jr.	

== Roster ==
2022–23 Stanford Cardinal women's basketball team
Players
Coaches

Pos.	#	Name	Height	Year	Previous school	Hometown
G	2	Agnes Emma-Nnopu	5 ft 11 in (1.8 m)	Jr	Lake Ginninderra College	Ocean Grove, Victoria
F	5	Francesca Belibi	6 ft 1 in (1.85 m)	Sr	Regis Jesuit	Centennial, CO
G	10	Talana Lepolo	5 ft 7 in (1.7 m)	Fr	Carondelet	Alameda, CA
F	11	Ashten Prechtel	6 ft 5 in (1.96 m)	Sr	Discovery Canyon	Colorado Springs, CO
G	12	Indya Nivar	5 ft 10 in (1.78 m)	Fr	Apex Friendship	Apex, NC
G	20	Elena Bosgana	6 ft 2 in (1.88 m)	So	American Community	Athens, GR
F	21	Brooke Demetre	6 ft 3 in (1.91 m)	So	Mater Dei	Foothill Ranch, CA
F	22	Cameron Brink	6 ft 4 in (1.93 m)	Jr	Mountainside	Beaverton, OR
G	24	Stavi Papadaki	5 ft 11 in (1.8 m)	Fr	2nd EPAL Chanion	Chania, Greece
G	30	Haley Jones	6 ft 1 in (1.85 m)	Sr	Archbishop Mitty	Santa Cruz, CA
G	31	Lauren Green	5 ft 8 in (1.73 m)	Fr	Castro Valley	Castro Valley, CA
G	32	Jzaniya Harriel	5 ft 10 in (1.78 m)	RS Fr	Antelope	Sacramento, CA
G	33	Hannah Jump	6 ft 0 in (1.83 m)	Sr	Pinewood	San Jose, CA
F	44	Kiki Iriafen	6 ft 3 in (1.91 m)	So	Harvard-Westlake	Los Angeles, CA
C	51	Lauren Betts	6 ft 7 in (2.01 m)	Fr	Grandview	Centennial, CO

Head coach

- Tara VanDerveer (Indiana)

Assistant coach(es)

- Kate Paye (Stanford)
- Katy Steding (Stanford)
- Britney Anderson (Virginia Tech)

Legend

- (C) Team captain
- (S) Suspended
- (I) Ineligible
- (W) Walk-on
- Injured
- Current redshirt

Roster
Last update: October 22, 2022

== Schedule ==
Date time, TV	Rank^{#}	Opponent^{#}	Result	Record	High points	High rebounds	High assists	Site (attendance) city, state
Exhibition
November 2, 2022; 7:00 pm	No. 2	Vanguard	W 102–25		12 – Jump	8 – Bosgana	6 – Lepolo	Maples Pavilion (2,281); Stanford, CA
Non-conference regular season
November 7, 2022; 7:00 pm	No. 2	San Diego State	W 86–48	1–0	16 – Iriafen	8 – Brink	11 – Lepolo	Maples Pavilion (3,012); Stanford, CA
November 9, 2022; 6:00 pm	No. 2	Cal State Northridge	W 104–40	2–0	18 – Betts	11 – Brink	7 – Jones	Maples Pavilion (2,421); Stanford, CA
November 11, 2022; 6:00 pm	No. 2	at Pacific	W 98–44	3–0	15 – Iriafen	8 – Betts	4 – Lepolo	Alex G. Spanos Center (1,759); Stockton, CA
November 13, 2022; 2:00 pm, ESPN2	No. 2	at Portland	W 87–47	4–0	17 – Jones	9 – Brink	9 – Lepolo	Chiles Center (2,047); Portland, OR
November 16, 2022; 8:00 pm, P12N	No. 2	Cal Poly	W 80–43	5–0	24 – Jump	7 – Betts	4 – Belibi	Maples Pavilion (2,469); Stanford, CA
November 20, 2022; 12:00 pm, ABC	No. 2	No. 1 South Carolina	L 71–76 ^{OT}	5–1	25 – Brink	9 – Jones	6 – Tied	Maples Pavilion (7,287); Stanford, CA
November 25, 2022; 2:00 pm	No. 2	vs. Florida Gulf Coast; Rainbow Wahine Showdown	W 93–69	6–1	24 – Jones	14 – Jones	5 – Lepolo	Stan Sheriff Center; Honolulu, HI
November 26, 2022; 2:00 pm	No. 2	vs. Grambling State; Rainbow Wahine Showdown	W 87–50	7–1	19 – Jump	13 – Betts	3 – Tied	Stan Sheriff Center; Honolulu, HI
November 27, 2022; 4:30 pm	No. 2	at Hawaii; Rainbow Wahine Showdown	W 68–39	8–1	17 – Prechtel	11 – Prechtel	8 – Lepolo	Stan Sheriff Center (2,152); Honolulu, HI
November 30, 2022; 7:00 pm	No. 2	Santa Clara	W 82–69	9–1	19 – Jump	11 – Jones	6 – Lepolo	Maples Pavilion (2,603); Stanford, CA
December 4, 2022; 12:00 pm, P12N	No. 2	No. 23 Gonzaga	W 84–63	10–1	17 – Demetre	16 – Brink	6 – Jones	Maples Pavilion (3,731); Stanford, CA
December 18, 2022; 12:00 pm, ABC	No. 2	Tennessee; Rivalry	W 77–70	11–1	21 – Brink	17 – Brink	3 – Jones	Maples Pavilion (4,480); Stanford, CA
December 20, 2022; 7:00 pm, P12N	No. 2	No. 21 Creighton	W 72–59	12–1	17 – Lepolo	16 – Brink	8 – Jones	Maples Pavilion (2,988); Stanford, CA
Pac-12 regular season
December 23, 2022; 12:00 pm, P12N	No. 2	California	W 90–69	13–1 (1–0)	21 – Jones	10 – Jones	4 – Jones	Maples Pavilion (3,970); Stanford, CA
December 31, 2022; 6:00 pm, P12N	No. 2	Arizona State	W 101–69	14–1 (2–0)	20 – Jump	14 – Brink	4 – Tied	Maples Pavilion (2,810); Stanford, CA
January 2, 2023; 11:30 am, P12N	No. 2	No. 15 Arizona	W 73–57	15–1 (3–0)	18 – Jones	16 – Jones	5 – Jones	Maples Pavilion (3,824); Stanford, CA
January 8, 2023; 4:00 pm, P12N	No. 2	at California	W 60–56	16–1 (4–0)	25 – Brink	17 – Brink	4 – Jones	Haas Pavilion (3,442); Berkeley, CA
January 13, 2023; 8:00 pm, P12N	No. 2	at No. 8 UCLA	W 72–59	17–1 (5–0)	16 – Jones	12 – Jones	6 – Tied	Pauley Pavilion (6,855); Los Angeles, CA
January 15, 2023; 2:00 pm, P12N	No. 2	at USC	L 46–55	17–2 (5–1)	11 – Brink	14 – Brink	3 – Brink	Galen Center (2,418); Los Angeles, CA
January 20, 2023; 6:00 pm, P12N	No. 4	No. 8 Utah	W 74–62	18–2 (6–1)	25 – Jones	14 – Brink	4 – Jones	Maples Pavilion (3,730); Stanford, CA
January 22, 2023; 2:00 pm, P12N	No. 4	No. 24 Colorado	W 62–49	19–2 (7–1)	21 – Jump	18 – Jones	3 – Jones	Maples Pavilion (4,122); Stanford, CA
January 27, 2023; 8:00 pm, P12N	No. 3	Oregon State	W 63–60	20–2 (8–1)	21 – Brink	13 – Brink	2 – Nivar	Maples Pavilion (3,890); Stanford, CA
January 29, 2023; 1:00 pm, P12N	No. 3	Oregon	W 62–54	21–2 (9–1)	16 – Brink	16 – Jones	6 – Lepolo	Maples Pavilion (5,133); Stanford, CA
February 3, 2023; 7:00 pm, P12N	No. 2	at Washington State	W 71–38	22–2 (10–1)	13 – Jones	8 – Brink	5 – Nivar	Beasley Coliseum (1,128); Pullman, WA
February 5, 2023; 12:00 pm, P12N	No. 2	at Washington	L 67–72	22–3 (10–2)	18 – Jones	6 – Brink	7 – Jones	Alaska Airlines Arena (4,317); Seattle, WA
February 9, 2023; 6:30 pm, ESPN	No. 6	at No. 17 Arizona	W 84–60	23–3 (11–2)	18 – Tied	12 – Jones	6 – Jones	McKale Center (9,868); Tucson, AZ
February 12, 2023; 11:00 am, P12N	No. 6	at Arizona State	W 96–64	24–3 (12–2)	17 – Emma-Nnopu	8 – Tied	5 – Jones	Desert Financial Arena (1,759); Tempe, AZ
February 17, 2023; 8:00 pm, P12N	No. 3	No. 25 USC	W 50–47	25–3 (13–2)	12 – Brink	10 – Tied	5 – Jones	Maples Pavilion (6,343); Stanford, CA
February 20, 2023; 6:00 pm, ESPN2	No. 3	No. 17 UCLA	W 71–66	26–3 (14–2)	25 – Brink	6 – Tied	3 – Brink	Maples Pavilion (5,813); Stanford, CA
February 23, 2023; 2:00 pm, P12N	No. 3	at No. 21 Colorado	W 73–62 ^{2OT}	27–3 (15–2)	23 – Jones	11 – Jones	7 – Jones	CU Events Center (2,963); Boulder, CO
February 25, 2023; 11:00 am, P12N	No. 3	at No. 8 Utah	L 78–84	27–4 (15–3)	24 – Jump	12 – Brink	6 – Brink	Jon M. Huntsman Center (9,611); Salt Lake City, UT
Pac-12 Women's Tournament
March 2, 2023; 2:30 pm, P12N	(1) No. 6	vs. (9) Oregon; Quarterfinals	W 76–65	28–4	22 – Brink	13 – Jones	8 – Jones	Michelob Ultra Arena (4,245); Paradise, NV
March 3, 2023; 6:00 pm, P12N	(1) No. 6	vs. (5) No. 19 UCLA; Semifinals	L 65–69	28–5	19 – Brink	11 – Brink	4 – Lepolo	Michelob Ultra Arena; Paradise, NV
NCAA Women's Tournament
March 17, 2023*; 4:30 pm, ESPN2	(1 S4) No. 5	(16 S4) Sacred Heart; First Round	W 92–49	29–5	17 – Jones	10 – Belibi	7 – Lepolo	Maples Pavilion (4,020); Stanford, CA
March 19, 2023*; 6:30 pm, ESPN	(1 S4) No. 5	(8 S4) Ole Miss; Second Round	L 49–54	29–6	20 – Brink	13 – Brink	2 – Tied	Maples Pavilion (5,361); Stanford, CA
*Non-conference game. ^{#}Rankings from AP poll. (#) Tournament seedings in parentheses. S4=Seattle 4. All times are in PST.

== Game summaries ==
This section will be filled in as the season progresses.

=== Vanguard (exhibition) ===
November 2
6:00 p.m.

Vanguard Lions 25, No. 2 Stanford Cardinal 102
Scoring by quarter: 10-19, 7–24, 2–30, 6–29
Pts: 2 tied, 7 Rebs: Sarah Matossian, 6 Asts: 2 tied, 2	Pts: Hannah Jump, 12; Rebs: Elena Bosgana, 8 Asts: Talana Lepolo, 6

Maples Pavilion - Stanford, CA
Attendance: 2,281
Referees: Katie Lukanich, Darren Krzesnik, Kyle Bacon

=== San Diego State ===
November 7
6:00 p.m.

San Diego State Aztecs 48, No. 2 Stanford Cardinal 86
Scoring by quarter: 4–25, 12-17, 18-27, 14-17
Pts: 2 tied, 9 Rebs: 4 tied, 5 Asts: 3 tied, 2	Pts: Kiki Iriafen, 15; Rebs: Cameron Brink, 8 Asts: Talana Lepolo, 11

Maples Pavilion - Stanford, CA
Attendance: 3,012
Referees: Sam Gibson, Kimberly Hobbs, Anita Ortega

=== Cal State Northridge ===
November 8
6:00 p.m.

Cal State Northridge Matadors 40, No. 2 Stanford Cardinal 104
Scoring by quarter: 11-23, 8-27, 12-22, 9-32
Pts: Cheyenne Givens, 8 Rebs: Kayanna Springs, 4 Asts: Cheyenne Givens, 2	Pts: Lauren Betts, 18; Rebs: Cameron Brink, 11; Asts: Haley Jones, 7

Maples Pavilion - Stanford, CA
Attendance: 2,421
Referees: Felecity Willis, Tyler Trimble, Brian Woods

=== at Pacific ===
November 11
6:00 p.m.

No. 2 Stanford Cardinal 98, Pacific Tigers 44
Scoring by quarter: 17-12, 28-8, 33-18, 20-6
Pts: Kiki Iriafen, 15; Rebs: Lauren Betts, 10; Asts: Talana Lepolo, 4	Pts: Liz Smith, 13; Rebs: 2 tied, 6 Asts: Diamond Richardson, 3

Alex G. Spanos Center - Stockton, CA
Attendance: 1,759
Referees: Deon Lewis, Sean Martin, Robert Scofield

=== at Portland ===
ESPN2

November 13
2:00 p.m.

No. 2 Stanford Cardinal 87, Portland Pilots 47
Scoring by quarter: 19-7, 24-10, 25-10, 19-20
Pts: Haley Jones, 17; Rebs: Cameron Brink, 9 Asts: Talana Lepolo, 9	Pts: Liana Katiu'u, 13; Rebs: Maisie Burnham, 6 Asts: Alex Fowler

Chiles Center - Portland, OR
Attendance: 2,047
Referees: Corey Long, Teresa Turner, Lisa Jones

=== Cal Poly ===
P12N

November 16
8:00 p.m.

Cal Poly Mustangs 43, No. 2 Stanford Cardinal 80
Scoring by quarter: 8–23, 9-19, 16-20, 10-18
Pts: Niki Kovacikova, 11; Rebs: Natalia Ackerman, 5 Asts: 2 tied, 2	Pts: Hannah Jump, 24; Rebs: Lauren Betts, 7 Asts: Francesa Belibi, 4

Maples Pavilion - Stanford, CA
Attendance: 2,469
Referees: Kelly Broomfield, Nicole Leon, Kenneth Nash

=== No. 1 South Carolina ===
ABC

November 20
12:00 p.m.

No. 1 South Carolina Gamecocks 76, No. 2 Stanford Cardinal 71 (OT)
Scoring by quarter: 11–21, 20-14, 13-19, 17-7, Overtime: 15-10
Pts: Aliyah Boston, 14; Rebs: Aliyah Boston, 13; Asts: Zia Cooke, 4	Pts: Cameron Brink, 25; Rebs: Haley Jones, 9 Asts: 2 tied, 6

Maples Pavilion - Stanford, CA
Attendance: 7,287
Referees: Tiffany Bird, Brenda Pantoja, Michol Murray

=== vs Florida Gulf Coast ===
TBD

November 25
2:00 p.m.

No. 2 Stanford Cardinal 93, Florida Gulf Coast Eagles 69
Scoring by quarter: 21-19, 20-18, 20-16, 32-16
Pts: Haley Jones, 24; Rebs: Haley Jones, 14; Asts: Talana Lepolo, 5	Pts: Tishara Morehouse, 24; Rebs: Uju Ezeudu, 4 Asts: Tishara Morehouse, 4

Stan Sheriff Center - Honolulu, HI
Attendance: 0
Referees: Steve Piercy, Sean Martin, Kimberly Hobbs

=== vs Grambling State ===
TBD

November 26
2:00 p.m.

Grambling State Tigers 50, No. 2 Stanford Cardinal 87
Scoring by quarter: 11–22, 11-24, 15-26, 13-15
Pts: Colbi Maples, 13; Rebs: Miracle Saxon, 4 Asts: Phylicia Allen, 3	Pts: Hannah Jump, 19; Rebs: Lauren Betts, 13; Asts: 3 tied, 3

Stan Sheriff Center - Honolulu, HI
Attendance: 1,340
Referees: Tim Tamashiro, Juchell Wardlow, Charles Gonzalez

=== at Hawaii ===
TBD

November 27
4:30 p.m.

No. 2 Stanford Cardinal 68, Hawaii Rainbow Warriors 39
Scoring by quarter: 25-7, 15-10, 11-15, 17-7
Pts: Ashten Prechtel, 17; Rebs: Ashten Prechtel, 11; Asts: Talana Lepolo, 8	Pts: Lily Wahinekapu, 12; Rebs: Imani Perez, 6 Asts: Lily Wahinekapu, 2

Stan Sheriff Center - Honolulu, HI
Attendance: 2,152
Referees: Steve Piercy, Juchell Wardlow, Charles Gonzalez

=== Santa Clara ===
TBD

November 30
7:00 p.m.

Santa Clara Broncos 69, No. 2 Stanford Cardinal 82
Scoring by quarter: 19–20, 10-20, 22-24, 18-18
Pts: Olivia Pollerd, 19; Rebs: Marya Hudgins, 9 Asts: Ashlee Maldonado, 5	Pts: Hannah Jump, 19; Rebs: Haley Jones, 11; Asts: Talana Lepolo, 6

Maples Pavilion - Stanford, CA
Attendance: 2,603
Referees: Lorena Ahumada, Anita Ortega, Michael Price

=== No. 23 Gonzaga ===
P12N

December 8
6:30 p.m.

No. 23 Gonzaga Bulldogs 63, No. 2 Stanford Cardinal 84
Scoring by quarter: 18–19, 18-26, 15-21, 12-18
Pts: Kaylynee Troung, 22; Rebs: Kaylynee Troung, 6 Asts: McKayla Williams, 3	Pts: Brooke Demetre, 17; Rebs: Cameron Brink, 16; Asts: Haley Jones, 6

Maples Pavilion - Stanford, CA
Attendance: 3,731
Referees: Felecity Willis, In'Fini Robinson, Lisa Jones

=== Tennessee ===
ABC

December 18
12:00 p.m.

Tennessee Lady Volunteers vs. Stanford Cardinal

Maples Pavilion - Stanford, CA

=== Creighton ===
TBD

December 20
2:00 p.m.

Creighton Bluejays vs. Stanford Cardinal

Maples Pavilion - Stanford, CA

=== California ===
P12N

December 23
12:00 p.m.

California Golden Bears vs. Stanford Cardinal

Maples Pavilion - Stanford, CA

=== Arizona State ===
P12N

January 31
6:00 p.m.

Arizona State Sun Devils vs. Stanford Cardinal

Maples Pavilion - Stanford, CA

=== Arizona ===
P12N

January 2
11:30 a.m.

Arizona Wildcats vs. Stanford Cardinal

Maples Pavilion - Stanford, CA

=== at California ===
P12N

January 8
4:00 p.m.

Stanford Cardinal vs. California Golden Bears

Haas Pavilion - Berkeley, CA

=== at UCLA ===
P12N

January 13
8:00 p.m.

Stanford Cardinal vs. UCLA Bruins

Pauley Pavilion - Los Angeles, CA

=== at USC ===
P12N

January 15
2:00 p.m.

Stanford Cardinal vs. USC Trojans

Galen Center - Los Angeles, CA

=== Utah ===
P12N

January 20
7:00 p.m.

Utah Utes vs. Stanford Cardinal

Maples Pavilion - Stanford, CA

=== Colorado ===
P12N

January 22
12:00 p.m.

Colorado Buffaloes vs. Stanford Cardinal

Maples Pavilion - Stanford, CA

=== Oregon State ===
P12N

January 27
8:00 p.m.

Oregon State Beavers vs. Stanford Cardinal

Maples Pavilion - Stanford, CA

=== Oregon ===
P12N

January 29
1:00 p.m.

Oregon Ducks vs. Stanford Cardinal

Maples Pavilion - Stanford, CA

=== at Washington State ===
P12N

February 3
7:00 p.m.

Stanford Cardinal vs. Washington State Cougars

Beasley Coliseum - Pullman, WA

=== at Washington ===
P12N

February 5
12:30 p.m.

Stanford Cardinal vs. Washington Huskies

Alaska Airlines Arena - Seattle, WA

=== at Arizona ===
ESPN

February 9
6:30 p.m.

Stanford Cardinal vs. Arizona Wildcats

McKale Center - Tucson, AZ

=== at Arizona State ===
P12N

February 12
11:00 a.m.

Stanford Cardinal vs. Arizona State Sun Devils

Desert Financial Arena - Tempe, AZ

=== USC ===
P12N

February 17
1:00 p.m.

USC Trojans vs. Stanford Cardinal

Maples Pavilion - Stanford, CA

=== UCLA ===
P12N

February 20
9:00 p.m.

UCLA Bruins vs. Stanford Cardinal

Maples Pavilion - Stanford, CA

=== at Colorado ===
P12N

February 23
2:00 p.m.

Stanford Cardinal vs. Colorado Buffaloes

CU Events Center - Boulder, CO

=== at Utah ===
P12N

February 25
11:00 a.m.

Stanford Cardinal vs. Utah Utes

Jon M. Huntsman Center - Salt Lake City, UT

== Awards and honors ==
Weekly honors
Honors	Player	Position	Date Awarded	Ref.

Conference honors
Honors	Player	Position

=== Midseason awards watchlists ===
Midseason award honors
Honors	Player	Position

=== Final awards watchlists ===
Final award honors
Honors	Player	Position

=== National awards ===
National award honors
Honors	Player	Position

== Rankings ==
Ranking movements Legend: ██ Increase in ranking ██ Decrease in ranking т = Tied with team above or below ( ) = First-place votes
	Week																			
Poll	Pre	1	2	3	4	5	6	7	8	9	10	11	12	13	14	15	16	17	18	Final
AP	2	2	2	2	2	2	2	2	2	2	4	3	2	6	3	3	6	5	5	Not released
Coaches	2 (1)	2	2	2	2	2	2	2	2	2	4	2	2	5	3	3	5	4т	4	10

== See also ==
- 2022–23 Stanford Cardinal men's basketball team
