= 2023 ASUN women's basketball tournament =

American college basketball postseason tournament

- Classification: Division I
- Season: 2022–23
- Teams: 10
- Site: Campus sites
- Champions: Florida Gulf Coast (10th title)
- Winning coach: Karl Smesko (10th title)
- Television: ESPN+

The 2023 ASUN women's basketball tournament was the conference postseason tournament for the ASUN Conference. The tournament was the 44th year the league has conducted a postseason tournament. The tournament was held March 4, 5, 8, and 11 at campus sites of the higher seeds. The winner will receive the conference's automatic bid to the 2023 NCAA Tournament.

2022–23 ASUN women's basketball standings
	Conf.				Overall
Team	W		L	PCT	W		L	PCT
Florida Gulf Coast†	17	–	1	.944	33	–	4	.892
Liberty	16	–	2	.889	24	–	9	.727
Lipscomb	13	–	5	.722	20	–	12	.625
Austin Peay	12	–	6	.667	17	–	12	.586
Eastern Kentucky	11	–	7	.611	18	–	14	.563
Kennesaw State	10	–	8	.556	15	–	16	.484
North Alabama	10	–	8	.556	15	–	15	.500
Jacksonville State	9	–	9	.500	16	–	14	.533
Stetson	6	–	12	.333	13	–	20	.394
Jacksonville	6	–	12	.333	12	–	17	.414
North Florida	5	–	13	.278	8	–	20	.286
Bellarmine*	5	–	13	.278	9	–	22	.290
Central Arkansas	3	–	15	.167	8	–	21	.276
Queens*	3	–	15	.167	8	–	21	.276
† 2023 ASUN Tournament winner As of March 20, 2023

== Seeds ==
Ten teams will contest the bracket. The tournament has a new format in 2023, as all rounds reseed instead of a traditional set bracket. To that end, the 9 and 10 seeds play each other in round 1, and the 7 and 8 seed do as well, rather than the traditional 7/10 and 8/9 matchup.

The two tiebreakers used by the ASUN are: 1) head-to-head record of teams with identical record and 2) NCAA NET Rankings available on day following the conclusion of ASUN regular season play.

Seed	School	Conference	NET ranking (March 2, 2023)
#1	Florida Gulf Coast	17-1	37
#2	Liberty	16-2	115
#3	Lipscomb	13-5	202
#4	Austin Peay	12–6	178
#5	Eastern Kentucky	11-7	205
#6	North Alabama	10-8	211
#7	Kennesaw State	10-8	231
#8	Jacksonville State	9-9	197
#9	Steton	6-12	262
#10	Jacksonville	6-12	238

== Schedule ==
Game	Time	Matchup	Score	Television
First round – Saturday, March 4 – Campus Sites
1	2:00 pm	#9 Stetson vs. #10 Jacksonville	60–53	ESPN+
2	3:00 pm	#7 Kennesaw State vs. #8 Jacksonville State	82–73	ESPN+
Quarterfinals – Sunday, March 5 – Campus Sites
3	4:00 pm	#9 Stetson at #1 Florida Gulf Coast	48–66	ESPN+
4	3:00 pm	#5 Eastern Kentucky at #4 Austin Peay	55–73	ESPN+
5	3:00 pm	#7 Kennesaw State at #2 Liberty	70–91	ESPN+
6	6:00 pm	#6 North Alabama at #3 Lipscomb	53–63	ESPN+
Semifinals – Wednesday, March 8 – Campus Sites
7	6:00 pm	#4 Austin Peay at #1 Florida Gulf Coast	34-51	ESPN+
8	6:00 pm	#3 Lipscomb at #2 Liberty	56-84	ESPN+
Championship – Saturday, March 11 – Campus Sites
9	6:00 pm	#2 Liberty at #1 Florida Gulf Coast	60-84	ESPN+
Game times in CT. Rankings denote tournament seed

== Bracket ==
First round Saturday, March 4
9	Stetson	60
10	Jacksonville	53
7	Kennesaw State	82
8	Jacksonville State	73

Quarterfinals; Sunday, March 5
1	Florida Gulf Coast	66
9	Stetson	48
4	Austin Peay	73
5	Eastern Kentucky	55
2	Liberty	91
7	Kennesaw State	70
3	Lipscomb	63
6	North Alabama	53

Semifinals; Wednesday, March 8
1	Florida Gulf Coast	51
4	Austin Peay	34
2	Liberty	84
3	Lipscomb	56

Championship; Saturday, March 11
1	Florida Gulf Coast	84
2	Liberty	60
