= Brynna Maxwell =

American basketball player

Eastern Washington Eagles
- Title: Assistant Coach
- League: Big Sky Conference

Personal information
- Born: August 29, 2000 (age 26) Portland, Oregon, U.S.
- Listed height: 6 ft 0 in (1.83 m)

Career information
- High school: Gig Harbor High School (Gig Harbor, Washington)
- College: Utah (2019–2022); Gonzaga (2022-2024)
- WNBA draft: 2024: 2nd round, 13th overall pick
- Drafted by: Chicago Sky
- Playing career: 2024–2025
- Position: Guard
- Coaching career: 2025–present

Career history

Playing
- 2024-2025: Celta Baloncesto Femenino

Coaching
- 2025-present: Eastern Washington (asst.)
- Stats at Basketball Reference

Brynna Marie Maxwell (born August 29, 2000) is an American professional basketball player for Celta Baloncesto Femenino of the Liga Femenina de Baloncesto in Spain. She was drafted by the Chicago Sky in the 2024 WNBA draft. She played college basketball for the Utah Utes and Gonzaga Bulldogs.

== Early life ==
Maxwell was born on August 29, 2000, in Portland, Oregon. The daughter of two college basketball players, she began playing the sport at an early age. She grew up in Gig Harbor, Washington, and attended Gig Harbor High School. She was a top player at Gig Harbor and finished as the team's all-time leading scorer (1,968 points), also setting other records including for most points in a game (48). She was twice selected first-team all-state and was named Gig Harbor's female athlete of the year as a senior, when she averaged 26.8 points per game. She helped the team win the state championship that year, 51–48, with Maxwell totaling 31 points in the game. The News-Tribune named her the 2019 area player of the year. Highly recruited, she committed to play college basketball for the Utah Utes.

== College career ==
As a freshman at Utah in the 2019–20 season, Maxwell started all 31 games and was named honorable mention All-Pac-12 Conference as well as first-team Pac-12 All-Freshman. She led the team with averages of 26.5 minutes and 13.1 points per game, also placing first in the Pac-12 for three-point shots made (83) and three-point shots made per game (2.7), as well as second in three-point percentage (.472). She was fourth nationally in three-point percentage and her 83 three-point shots set a Utah freshman record. In her second season, Maxwell again led the Utes in points per game (12.8) and repeated as an honorable mention All-Pac-12 selection. In 2021–22, she averaged 10.8 points and helped Utah compile a record of 21–12 while reaching the second round of the NCAA Tournament.

Maxwell transferred to the Gonzaga Bulldogs for the 2022–23 season, ending her stint at Utah having started 63-of-85 games played in. In her first year there, she placed third on the team with 13.5 points per game and was among the top three-point and free-throw shooters nationally, making 94.9% of her free throws and 48.1% of her three-point attempts; the latter total placed second in the country. She was selected first-team All-West Coast Conference (WCC) for her performance. In her final season, 2023–24, Maxwell had a career-best 14.2 points per game and repeated as a first-team All-WCC selection. She helped them compile a record of 32–4, the best in team history, as the Bulldogs reached the Sweet Sixteen of the NCAA Tournament.

== Professional career ==
Maxwell was selected in the second round (13th overall) of the 2024 WNBA draft by the Chicago Sky. She suffered an injury to her knee during training camp, and on May 13, 2024, Maxwell was waived by the Chicago Sky.

In June 2024, Maxwell signed with Celta Baloncesto Femenino of the Liga Femenina de Baloncesto in Spain.

== Coaching career ==
After playing overseas for a season in Spain, Maxwell was named assistant coach for the Eastern Washington Eagles women's basketball team in May 2025.

== Career statistics ==
Legend
| GP | Games played | GS | Games started | MPG | Minutes per game | RPG | Rebounds per game |
| APG | Assists per game | SPG | Steals per game | BPG | Blocks per game | PPG | Points per game |
| TO | Turnovers per game | FG% | Field-goal percentage | 3P% | 3-point field-goal percentage | FT% | Free-throw percentage |
| **Bold** | Career best | ° | League leader |

=== College ===
| Year | Team | GP | GS | MPG | FG% | 3P% | FT% | RPG | APG | SPG | BPG | TO | PPG |
|---|---|---|---|---|---|---|---|---|---|---|---|---|---|
| 2019–20 | Utah | 31 | 31 | 26.5 | **47.1** | 47.2 | 94.3 | 3.3 | 1.0 | 0.6 | 0.3 | 1.5 | 13.1 |
| 2020–21 | Utah | 21 | 21 | **32.0** | 36.0 | 33.6 | 92.4 | 3.0 | **1.6** | **1.5** | **0.6** | 2.4 | 12.8 |
| 2021–22 | Utah | 33 | 11 | 20.7 | 39.7 | 38.0 | 88.5 | 3.2 | 0.9 | 0.5 | 0.2 | **1.0** | 10.6 |
| 2022–23 | Gonzaga | 33 | 29 | 29.0 | 46.6 | **48.1** | **94.9** | **3.8** | 1.0 | 1.0 | 0.1 | 1.2 | 13.5 |
| 2023–24 | Gonzaga | **36** | **36** | 26.9 | 46.2 | 44.0 | 86.9 | 2.9 | 0.9 | 1.1 | 0.3 | **1.0** | **14.2** |
| **Career** | | 154 | 128 | 26.6 | 43.7 | 42.7 | 91.0 | 3.2 | 1.0 | 0.9 | 0.2 | 1.3 | 12.9 |
Statistics retrieved from Sports-Reference.
