= 2022–23 Gonzaga Bulldogs women's basketball team =

American college basketball season

2022–23 Gonzaga Bulldogs women's basketball

WCC regular season champions

NCAA tournament, First round
- Conference: West Coast Conference

Ranking
- AP: No. 19
- Record: 28–5 (17–1 WCC)
- Head coach: Lisa Fortier (9th season)
- Assistant coaches: Jordan Green; Stacy Clinesmith; Craig Fortier
- Home arena: McCarthey Athletic Center

2022–23 West Coast Conference women's basketball standings
	Conf.				Overall
Team	W		L	PCT	W		L	PCT
No. 19 Gonzaga	17	–	1	.944	28	–	5	.848
Portland†	15	–	3	.833	23	–	9	.719
San Diego	11	–	7	.611	19	–	14	.576
BYU	9	–	9	.500	16	–	17	.485
San Francisco	9	–	9	.500	19	–	13	.594
Pacific	8	–	10	.444	15	–	17	.469
Saint Mary's	6	–	12	.333	13	–	18	.419
Santa Clara	6	–	12	.333	15	–	17	.469
Pepperdine	5	–	13	.278	11	–	19	.367
Loyola Marymount	4	–	14	.222	7	–	23	.233
† 2023 WCC tournament winner As of March 24, 2023; Rankings from AP poll

The 2022–23 Gonzaga Bulldogs women's basketball team represented Gonzaga University in the 2022–23 NCAA Division I women's basketball season. The Bulldogs (also informally referred to as the "Zags") were members of the West Coast Conference. The Bulldogs, led by ninth year head coach Lisa Fortier, played their home games at the McCarthey Athletic Center on the university campus in Spokane, Washington.

== Previous season ==
The Bulldogs finished the season at 27–7 and 15–2 in WCC play to finish in second place. They won the WCC women's tournament by defeating BYU. They received an automatic bid to the NCAA Women's Tournament as a No. 9 seed in the Wichita region, where they defeated Nebraska in the first round before losing to Louisville in the second round.

== Offseason ==
=== Departures ===
Due to COVID-19 disruptions throughout NCAA sports in 2020–21, the NCAA announced that the 2020–21 season would not count against the athletic eligibility of any individual involved in an NCAA winter sport, including women's basketball. This meant that all seniors in 2020–21 had the option to return for 2021–22.

Name	Number	Pos.	Height	Year	Hometown	Reason for departure
Anamaria Birjoghe	1	F	6'5"	(redshirt) Senior	Târgoviște, Romania	Graduated
Abby O'Connor	4	G/F	6'0"	Senior	South Bend, IN	Graduate transferred to Carnegie Mellon
Cierra Walker	13	G	5'8"	(redshirt) Senior	Oregon City, OR	Graduated
Kylee Griffen	32	G	6'2"	(redshirt) Senior	Marysville, WA	Graduated
Melody Kempton	33	F	6'1"	Senior	Post Falls, ID	Graduated

=== Incoming transfers ===
Name	Number	Pos.	Height	Year	Hometown	Previous school
Destiny Burton	1	F/C	6'1"	Junior	Arlington, TX	Panola College
Brynna Maxwell	22	G	6'0"	Senior	Gig Harbor, WA	Utah

==== Recruiting ====
There was no recruiting class of 2022.

== Roster ==
2022–23 Gonzaga Bulldogs women's basketball team
Players
Coaches

Pos.	#	Name	Height	Year	Previous school	Hometown
F	0	Esther Little	6 ft 2 in (1.88 m)	RS So	Ipswich Basketball Academy	Ipswich, England
F	1	Destiny Burton	6 ft 0 in (1.83 m)	Jr	Mansfield Timberview; Panola College	Wichita, KS
G	2	Giana Riley	5 ft 8 in (1.73 m)	Fr	John C. Kimball	Manteca, CA
F	3	Payton Muma	5 ft 8 in (1.73 m)	RS Fr	Highlands Ranch	Highlands Ranch, CO
G	5	Maud Huijbens	6 ft 3 in (1.91 m)	So	N/A; Syracuse	Hilversum, Netherlands
F	10	Calli Stokes	5 ft 11 in (1.8 m)	RS Fr	Redondo	Redondo Beach, CA
G	11	Kayleigh Truong	5 ft 9 in (1.75 m)	Sr	Jersey Village	Houston, TX
F	12	Eliza Hollingsworth	6 ft 2 in (1.88 m)	RS Jr	St Leonard's College	Melbourne, Australia
G	14	Kaylynne Truong	5 ft 8 in (1.73 m)	Sr	Jersey Village	Houston, TX
F	15	Yvonne Ejim	6 ft 1 in (1.85 m)	Jr	Edge School	Calgary, AB
G	22	Brynna Maxwell	6 ft 0 in (1.83 m)	Sr	Gig Harbor; Utah	Gig Harbor, WA
G	24	McKayla Williams	6 ft 1 in (1.85 m)	Jr	Windward	Los Angeles, CA
G	35	Bree Salenbien	6 ft 2 in (1.88 m)	RS So	Lenawee Christian	Adrian, MI

Head coach

- Lisa Fortier (Cal State Monterey)

Assistant coach(es)

- Jordan Green (George Fox)
- Stacy Clinesmith (UC Santa Barbara)
- Craig Fortier (Cal State Monterey)

Legend

- (C) Team captain
- (S) Suspended
- (I) Ineligible
- (W) Walk-on
- Injured
- Current redshirt

Roster

== Schedule ==
Date time, TV	Rank^{#}	Opponent^{#}	Result	Record	High points	High rebounds	High assists	Site (attendance) city, state
Exhibition
November 4, 2022*; 6:00 p.m.		Western Washington	W 78–36		22 – Kayle. Truong	9 – Ejim	3 – Tied	McCarthey Athletic Center (4,777); Spokane, WA
Regular season
November 10, 2022*; 7:30 p.m., SWX		Long Beach State	W 80–54	1–0	22 – Ejim	10 – Ejim	6 – Tied	McCarthey Athletic Center (4,759); Spokane, WA
November 12, 2022*; 4:00 p.m.		Southern Utah	W 91–38	2–0	17 – Hollingsworth	6 – Tied	7 – Kayle. Truong	McCarthey Athletic Center (4,946); Spokane, WA
November 15, 2022*; 7:00 p.m.		at Wyoming	W 66–64	3–0	26 – Ejim	7 – Ejim	4 – Tied	Arena-Auditorium (2,077); Laramie, WY
November 19, 2022*; 4:30 p.m., FloHoops		vs. No. 6 Louisville; Battle 4 Atlantis quarterfinals	W 79–67 ^{OT}	4–0	21 – Maxwell	9 – Ejim	5 – Tied	Imperial Arena (421); Nassau, Bahamas
November 20, 2022*; 11:30 a.m., FloHoops		vs. Marquette; Battle 4 Atlantis semifinals	L 66–70	4–1	18 – Tied	11 – Ejim	6 – Kayly. Truong	Imperial Arena (103); Nassau, Bahamas
November 21, 2022*; 11:30 a.m., ESPNU		vs. No. 23 Tennessee; Battle 4 Atlantis 3rd place game	W 73–72	5–1	22 – Ejim	9 – Ejim	6 – Kayly. Truong	Imperial Arena (118); Nassau, Bahamas
November 26, 2022*; 2:00 p.m.		Eastern Washington	Canceled					McCarthey Athletic Center; Spokane, WA
November 28, 2022*; 6:00 p.m., SWX	No. 23	Maine	W 62–43	6–1	15 – Kayly. Truong	8 – Ejim	6 – Kayly. Truong	McCarthey Athletic Center (4,602); Spokane, WA
December 1, 2022*; 3:30 p.m., ESPN+	No. 23	at Stephen F. Austin	W 71–59	7–1	21 – Kayly. Truong	9 – Ejim	7 – Kayly. Truong	William R. Johnson Coliseum (1,920); Nacogdoches, TX
December 4, 2022*; 12:00 p.m., P12N	No. 23	at No. 2 Stanford	L 63–84	7–2	22 – Kayly. Truong	6 – Kayly. Truong	3 – Williams	Maples Pavilion (3,731); Stanford, CA
December 6, 2022*; 6:00 p.m.	No. 22	Queens (NC)	W 73–49	8–2	32 – Ejim	7 – Ejim	6 – Muma	McCarthey Athletic Center (4,304); Spokane, WA
December 11, 2022*; 2:00 p.m.	No. 22	UC Davis	W 73–55	9–2	19 – Maxwell	9 – Maxwell	7 – Kayly. Truong	McCarthey Athletic Center (4,856); Spokane, WA
December 17, 2022; 2:00 p.m., SWX	No. 23	BYU	W 67–58	10–2 (1–0)	24 – Kayly. Truong	7 – Ejim	4 – Kayly. Truong	McCarthey Athletic Center (5,037); Spokane, WA
December 19, 2022; 6:00 p.m.	No. 22	San Diego	W 70–59	11–2 (2–0)	20 – Kayly. Truong	9 – Ejim	2 – Tied	McCarthey Athletic Center (4,896); Spokane, WA
December 21, 2022*; 6:00 p.m., SWX	No. 22	Montana	W 82–67	12–2	23 – Maxwell	9 – Ejim	7 – Kayly. Truong	McCarthey Athletic Center (5,077); Spokane, WA
December 29, 2022; 4:00 p.m.	No. 19	at Pepperdine	W 77–63	13–2 (3–0)	26 – Kayly. Truong	9 – Tied	4 – Stokes	Firestone Fieldhouse (268); Malibu, CA
December 31, 2022; 2:00 p.m.	No. 19	at Loyola Marymount	W 96–51	14–2 (4–0)	24 – Ejim	8 – Ejim	6 – Kayly. Truong	Gersten Pavilion (510); Los Angeles, CA
January 5, 2023; 6:00 p.m., SWX	No. 20	San Francisco	W 63–52	15–2 (5–0)	17 – Kayly. Truong	12 – Ejim	9 – Kayly. Truong	McCarthey Athletic Center (4,823); Spokane, WA
January 7, 2023; 2:00 p.m.	No. 20	Santa Clara	W 78–61	16–2 (6–0)	17 – Maxwell	12 – Ejim	7 – Kayly. Truong	McCarthey Athletic Center (5,077); Spokane, WA
January 14, 2023; 5:00 p.m.	No. 20	at Portland	W 73–66	17–2 (7–0)	20 – Maxwell	12 – Ejim	9 – Little	Chiles Center (1,167); Portland, OR
January 19, 2023; 11:00 a.m.	No. 16	at Pacific	W 81–78	18–2 (8–0)	22 – Ejim	12 – Ejim	9 – Kayly. Truong	Alex G. Spanos Center (2,000); Stockton, CA
January 21, 2023; 1:00 p.m.	No. 16	at Saint Mary’s	W 82–57	19–2 (9–0)	24 – Ejim	6 – Stokes	5 – Kayly. Truong	University Credit Union Pavilion (563); Moraga, CA
January 26, 2023; 6:00 p.m., SWX	No. 17	Loyola Marymount	W 66–55	20–2 (10–0)	19 – Kayly. Truong	6 – Stokes	6 – Kayly. Truong	McCarthey Athletic Center (5,122); Spokane, WA
January 28, 2023; 2:00 p.m.	No. 17	Pepperdine	W 67–49	21–2 (11–0)	26 – Maxwell	9 – Stokes	9 – Kayly. Truong	McCarthey Athletic Center (5,251); Spokane, WA
February 2, 2023; 6:00 p.m.	No. 17	at Santa Clara	L 72–77	21–3 (11–1)	26 – Ejim	7 – Ejim	5 – Williams	Leavey Center (408); Santa Clara, CA
February 4, 2023; 2:00 p.m., KHQ/RTNW	No. 17	at San Francisco	W 78–56	22–3 (12–1)	27 – Kayly. Truong	9 – Ejim	5 – Kayly. Truong	War Memorial Gymnasium; San Francisco, CA
February 11, 2023; 1:00 p.m., SWX/RTNW	No. 23	Portland	W 63–53	23–3 (13–1)	20 – Kayly. Truong	6 – Tied	5 – Kayly. Truong	McCarthey Athletic Center (6,000); Spokane, WA
February 16, 2023; 6:00 p.m., SWX	No. 20	Pacific	W 69–58	24–3 (14–1)	21 – Kayly. Truong	9 – Ejim	3 – Tied	McCarthey Athletic Center (4,970); Spokane, WA
February 18, 2023; 2:00 p.m., SWX	No. 20	Saint Mary’s	W 65–51	25–3 (15–1)	25 – Ejim	8 – Ejim	5 – Kayly. Truong	McCarthey Athletic Center (5,514); Spokane, WA
February 23, 2023; 6:00 p.m.	No. 18	at San Diego	W 73–61	26–3 (16–1)	14 – Tied	11 – Ejim	4 – Ejim	Jenny Craig Pavilion (420); San Diego, CA
February 25, 2023; 4:00 p.m., byutv	No. 18	at BYU	W 58–51	27–3 (17–1)	19 – Ejim	10 – Ejim	2 – Tied	Marriott Center (1,994); Provo, UT
WCC Women's Tournament
March 6, 2023; 12:00 p.m., byutv	(1) No. 16	vs. (5) BYU; Semifinals	W 79–64	28–3	21 – Ejim	11 – Ejim	7 – Kayly. Truong	Orleans Arena; Paradise, NV
March 7, 2023; 1:00 p.m., ESPNU	(1) No. 16	vs. (2) Portland; Championship	L 60–64	28–4	21 – Ejim	14 – Ejim	5 – Kayly. Truong	Orleans Arena; Paradise, NV
NCAA tournament
March 17, 2023*; 7:00 p.m., ESPNU	(9 S4) No. 19	vs. (8 S4) Ole Miss; First Round	L 48–71	28–5	19 – Ejim	8 – Ejim	6 – Kayly. Truong	Maples Pavilion (4,020); Stanford, CA
*Non-conference game. ^{#}Rankings from AP Poll. (#) Tournament seedings in parentheses. S4=Seattle 4. All times are in Pacific Time Zone.

== Rankings ==
Ranking movements Legend: ██ Increase in ranking ██ Decrease in ranking RV = Received votes
	Week																				
Poll	Pre	1	2	3	4	5	6	7	8	9	10	11	12	13	14	15	16	17	18	19	Final
AP	RV	RV*	RV	RV	23	22	23	22	19	20	20	16	17	17	23	20	18	15	16	19	Not released
Coaches	RV	RV*	RV^	RV	25	23	23	22	20	20	21	19	20	18	22	19	18	15	15	17	RV

*The preseason and week 1 polls were the same.
^Coaches did not release a week 2 poll.

== See also ==
- 2022–23 Gonzaga Bulldogs men's basketball team
