= 2022–23 Florida Gulf Coast Eagles women's basketball team =

American college basketball season

2022–23 Florida Gulf Coast Eagles women's basketball
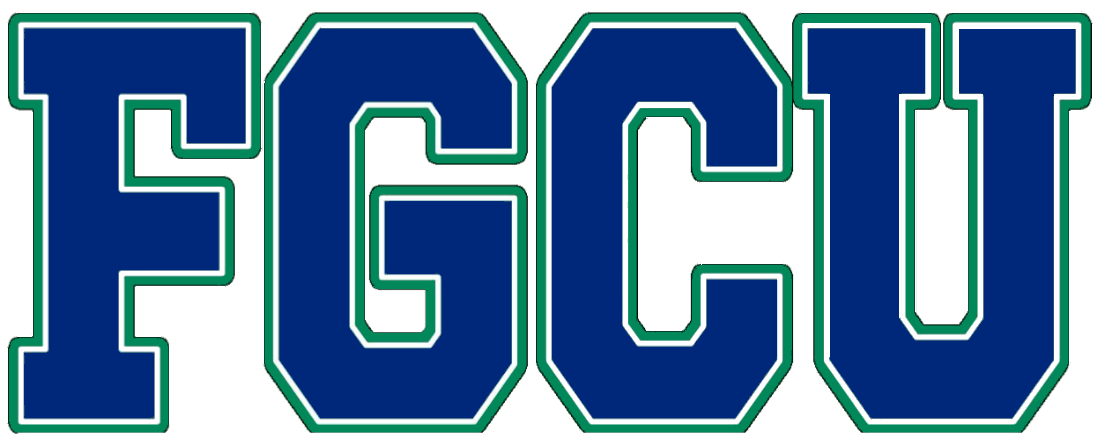

ASUN regular season and Tournament Champions

NCAA tournament, Second Round
- Conference: ASUN

Ranking
- Coaches: No. 24
- Record: 33–4 (17–1 ASUN)
- Head coach: Karl Smesko (21st season)
- Assistant coaches: Chelsea Lyles; Shannon Murphy; Camryn Brown
- Home arena: Alico Arena

2022–23 ASUN women's basketball standings
	Conf.				Overall
Team	W		L	PCT	W		L	PCT
Florida Gulf Coast†	17	–	1	.944	33	–	4	.892
Liberty	16	–	2	.889	24	–	9	.727
Lipscomb	13	–	5	.722	20	–	12	.625
Austin Peay	12	–	6	.667	17	–	12	.586
Eastern Kentucky	11	–	7	.611	18	–	14	.563
Kennesaw State	10	–	8	.556	15	–	16	.484
North Alabama	10	–	8	.556	15	–	15	.500
Jacksonville State	9	–	9	.500	16	–	14	.533
Stetson	6	–	12	.333	13	–	20	.394
Jacksonville	6	–	12	.333	12	–	17	.414
North Florida	5	–	13	.278	8	–	20	.286
Bellarmine*	5	–	13	.278	9	–	22	.290
Central Arkansas	3	–	15	.167	8	–	21	.276
Queens*	3	–	15	.167	8	–	21	.276
† 2023 ASUN Tournament winner As of March 20, 2023

The 2022–23 Florida Gulf Coast Eagles women's basketball team represented Florida Gulf Coast University during the 2022–23 NCAA Division I women's basketball season. The Eagles, led by twenty-first year head coach Karl Smesko, played their home games at the Alico Arena and were members of the Atlantic Sun Conference.

== Roster ==
2022–23 Florida Gulf Coast Eagles women's basketball team
Players
Coaches

Pos.	#	Name	Height	Year	Previous school	Hometown
G	0	Kaela Webb	5 ft 6 in (1.68 m)	Sr	Detroit Country Day; Providence	Pontiac, MI
G	1	Alyza Winston	5 ft 8 in (1.73 m)	RS Jr	Muskegon; Mississippi State	Muskegon, MI
G	2	Sophia Stiles	5 ft 9 in (1.75 m)	GS	Malta HS; Montana	Malta, MT
G	3	Cerina Rolle	5 ft 9 in (1.75 m)	Fr	Eustis HS	Eustis, FL
G	4	Tishara Morehouse	5 ft 3 in (1.6 m)	Sr	Rufus King; Western Nebraska	Milwaukee, WI
G	10	Jordan Campbell	5 ft 9 in (1.75 m)	RS Fr	IMG Academy	Purcelleville, VA
G/F	11	Maddie Antenucci	5 ft 10 in (1.78 m)	RS So	Indian Hill	Cincinnati, OH
F	14	Shekinah Guthrie	5 ft 10 in (1.78 m)	GS	Centennial; Palm Beach Atlantic	Atlanta, GA
G	20	Sha Carter	6 ft 0 in (1.83 m)	GS	Wylie E. Groves; Walsh	Southfield, MI
G	21	Kierra Adams	6 ft 0 in (1.83 m)	RS So	Brookwood	Vancouver, WA
G	22	Brylee Bartram	5 ft 8 in (1.73 m)	RS Jr	Seffner; Vanderbilt	Tampa, FL
G	24	Seneca Jackley	5 ft 9 in (1.75 m)	RS So	St. Mary's	Colorado Springs, CO
G	32	Emma List	5 ft 10 in (1.78 m)	GS	Discovery Canyon; Albany	Colorado Springs, CO
G	34	Milan Schimmel	5 ft 8 in (1.73 m)	RS Sr	Nixyaawii Community School; Cincinnati	Mission, OR
F	42	Uju Ezeudu	6 ft 0 in (1.83 m)	RS Jr	Reynoldsburg; Denver	Reynoldsburg, OH

Head coach

- Karl Smesko (Kent State)

Assistant coach(es)

- Chelsea Lyles (Florida Gulf Coast)
- Shannon Murphy (Florida Gulf Coast)
- Camryn Brown (High Point)

Legend

- (C) Team captain
- (S) Suspended
- (I) Ineligible
- (W) Walk-on
- Injured
- Current redshirt

Roster

== Schedule ==
Date time, TV	Rank^{#}	Opponent^{#}	Result	Record	Site (attendance) city, state
Non-conference regular season
November 7, 2022*; 7:00 p.m., ESPN+		Old Dominion	W 81–62	1–0	Alico Arena (2,757); Fort Myers, FL
November 13, 2022*; 2:00 p.m., ESPN+		at FIU	W 92–63	2–0	Ocean Bank Convocation Center (431); Miami, FL
November 18, 2022*; 7:30 p.m., ESPN+		at Hawaii; Bank of Hawai'i Classic	W 65–45	3–0	Stan Sheriff Center (1,239); Honolulu, HI
November 20, 2022*; 4:30 p.m.		vs. San Diego; Bank of Hawai'i Classic	W 68–60	4–0	Stan Sheriff Center (105); Honolulu, HI
November 25, 2022*; 5:00 p.m.		vs. No. 2 Stanford; Rainbow Wahine Showdown	L 69–93	4–1	Stan Sheriff Center; Honolulu, HI
November 26, 2022*; 7:30 p.m., ESPN+		at Hawaii; Rainbow Wahine Showdown	W 63–50	5–1	Stan Sheriff Center (1,340); Honolulu, HI
November 27, 2022*; 5:30 p.m.		vs. Grambling State; Rainbow Wahine Showdown	W 73–67	6–1	Stan Sheriff Center; Honolulu, HI
December 4, 2022*; 3:00 p.m., ESPN+		Ave Maria	W 88–35	7–1	Alico Arena (1,207); Fort Myers, FL
December 8, 2022*; 7:00 p.m., ESPN+		Palm Beach Atlantic	W 93–36	8–1	Alico Arena (1,215); Fort Myers, FL
December 11, 2022*; 1:00 p.m., ESPN+		Duke	L 48–71	8–2	Alico Arena (2,183); Fort Myers, FL
December 18, 2022*; 1:00 p.m., SECN+		at Kentucky	W 69–63	9–2	Memorial Coliseum (3,267); Lexington, KY
December 21, 2022*; 1:00 p.m., ESPN+		at Mercer	W 91–81	10–2	Hawkins Arena (672); Macon, GA
December 28, 2022*; 5:00 p.m., ESPN+		Brown	W 89–75	11–2	Alico Arena (1,404); Fort Myers, FL
December 29, 2022*; 7:00 p.m., ESPN+		Mercer	W 64–57	12–2	Alico Arena (1,252); Fort Myers, FL
ASUN Regular Season
January 2, 2023; 7:00 p.m., ESPN+		Liberty	W 70–53	13–2 (1–0)	Alico Arena (1,509); Fort Myers, FL
January 5, 2023; 7:00 p.m., ESPN+		Jacksonville	W 77–51	14–2 (2–0)	Alico Arena (1,497); Fort Myers, FL
January 7, 2023; 6:00 p.m., ESPN+		at North Alabama	W 86–58	15–2 (3–0)	Flowers Hall (504); Florence, AL
January 12, 2023; 7:00 p.m., ESPN+		North Alabama	W 74–51	16–2 (4–0)	Alico Arena (1,463); Fort Myers, FL
January 14, 2023; 7:00 p.m., ESPN+		Central Arkansas	W 86–31	17–2 (5–0)	Alico Arena (1,405); Fort Myers, FL
January 19, 2023; 7:00 p.m., ESPN+		at Queens	W 95–56	18–2 (6–0)	Curry Arena (132); Charlotte, NC
January 21, 2023; 7:00 p.m., ESPN+		at Liberty	L 78–88 ^{OT}	18–3 (6–1)	Liberty Arena (1,242); Lynchburg, VA
January 26, 2023; 7:00 p.m., ESPN+		Eastern Kentucky	W 84–61	19–3 (7–1)	Alico Arena (1,629); Fort Myers, FL
January 28, 2023; 7:00 p.m., ESPN+		Bellarmine	W 86–44	20–3 (8–1)	Alico Arena (1,703); Fort Myers, FL
February 2, 2023; 1:00 p.m., ESPN+		at Jacksonville	W 77–31	21–3 (9–1)	Swisher Gymnasium (100); Jacksonville, FL
February 4, 2023; 2:00 p.m., ESPN+		at North Florida	W 106–51	22–3 (10–1)	UNF Arena (449); Jacksonville, FL
February 8, 2023; 7:00 p.m., ESPN+		Stetson	W 100–58	23–3 (11–1)	Alico Arena (1,806); Fort Myers, FL
February 11, 2023; 1:00 p.m., ESPN+		at Stetson	W 67–57	24–3 (12–1)	Edmunds Center (155); DeLand, FL
February 15, 2023; 7:00 p.m., ESPN+		Lipscomb	W 78–61	25–3 (13–1)	Alico Arena (1,819); Fort Myers, FL
February 18, 2023; 3:00 p.m., ESPN3		Austin Peay	W 55–42	26–3 (14–1)	Alico Arena (2,201); Fort Myers, FL
February 23, 2023; 7:00 p.m., ESPN+		at Kennesaw State	W 82–56	27–3 (15–1)	KSU Convocation Center (471); Kennesaw, GA
February 25, 2023; 5:00 p.m., ESPN+		at Jacksonville State	W 76–46	28–3 (16–1)	Pete Mathews Coliseum (745); Jacksonville, AL
March 1, 2023; 7:00 p.m., ESPN+		at Lipscomb	W 101–59	29–3 (17–1)	Allen Arena (508); Nashville, TN
ASUN Women's Tournament
March 5, 2023; 5:00 p.m., ESPN+	(1)	(9) Stetson; Quarterfinals	W 66–48	30–3	Alico Arena (1,350); Fort Myers, FL
March 8, 2023; 7:00 p.m., ESPN+	(1)	(4) Austin Peay; Semifinals	W 51–34	31–3	Alico Arena (1,820); Fort Myers, FL
March 11, 2023; 7:00 p.m., ESPN+	(1)	(2) Liberty; Championship Game	W 84–60	32–3	Alico Arena (2,694); Fort Myers, FL
NCAA tournament
March 18, 2023*; 2:30 p.m., ESPNU	(12 G2)	vs. (5 G2) No. 23 Washington State; First Round	W 74–63	33–3	Finneran Pavilion; Villanova, PA
March 20, 2023*; 7:00 p.m., ESPNU	(12 G2)	at (4 G2) No. 10т Villanova; Second Round	L 57–76	33–4	Finneran Pavilion (4,361); Villanova, PA
*Non-conference game. ^{#}Rankings from AP Poll. (#) Tournament seedings in parentheses. G2=Greenville 2. All times are in Eastern.

== Rankings ==
Ranking movements Legend: ██ Increase in ranking ██ Decrease in ranking — = Not ranked RV = Received votes т = Tied with team above or below
	Week																				
Poll	Pre	1	2	3	4	5	6	7	8	9	10	11	12	13	14	15	16	17	18	19	Final
AP	—	—*	—	—	—	—	—	—	—	—	—	—	—	—	RV	RV	RV	RV	RV	RV	Not released
Coaches	RV	RV*	25^	RV	RV	RV	RV	RV	RV	RV	RV	RV	RV	RV	RV	25т	24	24	23	22	24

*The preseason and week 1 polls were the same.
^Coaches did not release a week 2 poll.

== See also ==
- 2022–23 Florida Gulf Coast Eagles men's basketball team
