= 2022–23 NCAA Division I women's basketball rankings =

- Season: 2022–23
- NCAA Tournament: 2023
- Preseason No. 1: South Carolina
- NCAA Tournament Champions: LSU
NCAA Division I women's basketball rankings


Two human polls make up the 2022–23 NCAA Division I women's basketball rankings, the AP Poll and the Coaches Poll, in addition to various publications' preseason polls.

== Legend ==
	Increase in ranking
	Decrease in ranking
	Not ranked previous week
Italics	Number of first-place votes
(#–#)	Win–loss record
т	Tied with team above or below also with this symbol

== AP Poll ==
The women's basketball poll began during the 1976–77 season, and was initially compiled by Mel Greenberg and published by The Philadelphia Inquirer. At first, it was a poll of coaches conducted via telephone, where coaches identified top teams and a list of the Top 20 teams was produced. The contributors continued to be coaches until 1994, when the AP took over administration of the poll from Greenberg, and switched to a panel of writers. Three Texas teams were in the very first ranking in 1976: Wayland Baptist, Stephen F. Austin and Baylor. On January 23, 2023, for the first time in 47 years, no teams from Texas were in the top 25, ending an 835-week run with at least one Texas team in the rankings.

	Preseason Oct 18	Week 2 Nov 14	Week 3 Nov 21	Week 4 Nov 28	Week 5 Dec 5	Week 6 Dec 12	Week 7 Dec 19	Week 8 Dec 26	Week 9 Jan 2	Week 10 Jan 9	Week 11 Jan 16	Week 12 Jan 23	Week 13 Jan 30	Week 14 Feb 6	Week 15 Feb 13	Week 16 Feb 20	Week 17 Feb 27	Week 18 Mar 6	Week 19 Mar 13	
1.	South Carolina (30)	South Carolina (2–0) (30)	South Carolina (4–0) (29)	South Carolina (6–0) (29)	South Carolina (8–0) (29)	South Carolina (9–0) (28)	South Carolina (11–0) (28)	South Carolina (12–0) (28)	South Carolina (13–0) (28)	South Carolina (16–0) (28)	South Carolina (18–0) (28)	South Carolina (20–0) (28)	South Carolina (21–0) (28)	South Carolina (23–0) (28)	South Carolina (25–0) (28)	South Carolina (27–0) (27)	South Carolina (29–0) (28)	South Carolina (32–0) (28)	South Carolina (32–0) (28)	1.
2.	Stanford	Stanford (4–0)	Stanford (5–1)	Stanford (8–1)	Stanford (10–1)	Stanford (10–1)	Stanford (11–1)	Stanford (13–1)	Stanford (14–1)	Stanford (16–1)	Ohio State (18–0)	Ohio State (19–0)	Stanford (21–2)	Indiana (22–1)	Indiana (23–1)	Indiana (26–1) (1)	Indiana (26–2)	Iowa (26–6)	Indiana (27–3)	2.
3.	Texas	Texas (1–0)	UConn (3–0)	UConn (5–0)	Ohio State (8–0)	Ohio State (10–0)	Ohio State (11–0)	Ohio State (13–0)	Ohio State (15–0)	Ohio State (17–0)	LSU (18–0)	Stanford (19–2)	LSU (20–0)	LSU (23–0)	Stanford (24–3)	Stanford (25–3)	Utah (25–3)	Indiana (27–3)	Iowa (26–6)	3.
4.	Iowa	Iowa (3–0)	Ohio State (4–0)	Ohio State (6–0)	Indiana (9–0)	Indiana (10–0)	Indiana (11–0)	Indiana (12–0)	Notre Dame (12–1)	UConn (13–2)	Stanford (17–2)	LSU (19–0)	Indiana (20–1)	UConn (21–3)	Utah (22–2)	UConn (24–4)	LSU (27–1)	Virginia Tech (27–4)	Virginia Tech (27–4)	4.
5.	Tennessee	UConn (1–0)	Iowa State (4–0)	Indiana (7–0)	Notre Dame (7–1)	Notre Dame (8–1)	Notre Dame (9–1)	Notre Dame (10–1)	UConn (11–2)	LSU (16–0)	UConn (15–2)	UConn (17–2)	UConn (20–2)	Iowa (19–4)	LSU (23–1)	LSU (25–1)	Maryland (24–5)	Stanford (28–5)	Stanford (28–5)	5.
6.	UConn	Louisville (3–0)	Indiana (5–0)	North Carolina (6–0)	UConn (6–1)	Virginia Tech (10–0)	North Carolina (9–1)	NC State (11–1)	Indiana (13–1)	Indiana (14–1)	Indiana (16–1)	Indiana (17–1)	Iowa (17–4)	Stanford (22–3)	UConn (22–4)	Iowa (22–5)	Stanford (27–4)	Maryland (25–6)	UConn (29–5)	6.
7.	Louisville	Iowa State (2–0)	Notre Dame (4–0)	Notre Dame (6–0)	Virginia Tech (8–0)	North Carolina (8–1)	NC State (11–1)	Virginia Tech (11–1)	LSU (14–0)	Notre Dame (12–2)	Notre Dame (14–2)	Notre Dame (16–2)	Utah (18–2)	Utah (20–2)	Iowa (20–5)	Maryland (22–5)	Iowa (23–6)	UConn (28–5)	Maryland (25–6)	7.
8.	Iowa State	Ohio State (2–0)	North Carolina (4–0)	Iowa State (5–1)	North Carolina (6–1) т	NC State (9–1)	Virginia Tech (10–1)	UConn (9–2)	Utah (14–0)	UCLA (14–2)	Utah (15–1)	UCLA (17–3)	Maryland (17–4)	Maryland (19–5)	Maryland (21–5)	Utah (23–3)	Virginia Tech (24–4)	Utah (25–4)	Utah (25–4)	8.
9.	Notre Dame	Notre Dame (2–0)	Iowa (4–1)	Virginia Tech (6–0)	NC State (6–1) т	UConn (7–2)	UConn (8–2)	LSU (12–0)	Virginia Tech (12–2)	Maryland (13–3)	UCLA (15–3)	Utah (16–2)	Notre Dame (17–3)	Duke (20–3)	Duke (22–3)	Virginia Tech (22–4)	UConn (25–5)	LSU (28–2)	LSU (28–2)	9.
10.	NC State	NC State (3–0)	Louisville (4–1)	Iowa (5–2)	Iowa State (6–1)	UCLA (9–1)	LSU (11–0)	UCLA (12–1)	NC State (12–2)	Utah (14–1)	Iowa (14–4)	Iowa (15–4) т	Ohio State (19–3)	Notre Dame (18–4)	Notre Dame (20–4)	Notre Dame (22–4)	Notre Dame (24–4)	Villanova (28–5)	Villanova (28–6)	10.
11.	Indiana	Tennessee (1–1)	Virginia Tech (3–0)	LSU (7–0)	LSU (9–0)	LSU (9–0)	UCLA (11–1)	Utah (12–0)	Iowa State (9–2)	NC State (13–3)	Maryland (14–4)	Maryland (16–4) т	North Carolina (16–5)	Virginia Tech (18–4)	Virginia Tech (20–4)	Duke (23–4)	Villanova (25–5)	Notre Dame (25–5)	Notre Dame (25–5)	11.
12.	North Carolina	Indiana (2–0)	LSU (5–0)	NC State (6–1)	Arizona (7–0)	Iowa (8–3)	Utah (10–0)	Iowa (10–3)	UCLA (13–2)	Iowa (12–4)	Virginia Tech (14–3)	Virginia Tech (16–3)	Iowa State (15–4)	Michigan (19–5)	Michigan (20–5)	Michigan (20–6)	Texas (22–7)	Ohio State (25–7)	Ohio State (25–7)	12.
13.	Virginia Tech	North Carolina (2–0)	NC State (4–1)	Creighton (6–0)	UCLA (8–1)	Utah (8–0)	Iowa (9–3)	North Carolina (9–2)	Maryland (11–3)	Virginia Tech (13–3)	Duke (16–1)	Michigan (16–3)	Virginia Tech (17–4)	Ohio State (20–4)	Ohio State (21–4)	Oklahoma (22–4)	Duke (24–5)	Duke (25–6)	Duke (25–6)	13.
14.	Ohio State	Virginia Tech (2–0)	Maryland (4–1)	Arizona (6–0)	Michigan (9–0)	Iowa State (7–2)	Iowa State (8–2)	Michigan (11–1)	Michigan (12–2)	Arizona (14–2)	Michigan (15–3)	Oklahoma (16–2)	UCLA (17–5)	North Carolina (17–6)	Villanova (22–4)	Arizona (21–6)	Ohio State (23–6)	Oklahoma (24–5)	UCLA (25–9)	14.
15.	Oklahoma	LSU (3–0)	Arizona (4–0)	UCLA (7–0)	Utah (7–0)	Maryland (9–3)	Maryland (9–3)	Iowa State (8–2)	Arizona (12–1)	Iowa State (10–3)	Oklahoma (14–2)	North Carolina (14–5)	NC State (16–5)	Villanova (20–4)	Oklahoma (20–4)	Villanova (23–5)	Gonzaga (27–3)	Texas (23–8)	Texas (25–9)	15.
16.	LSU	Oklahoma (2–0)	Creighton (4–0)	Utah (6–0)	Iowa (6–3)	Oregon (7–1)	Oregon (9–1)	Maryland (10–3)	Iowa (11–4)	Duke (14–1)	Gonzaga (17–2)	Duke (17–2)	Duke (18–3)	Oklahoma (18–4)	UCLA (20–6)	Ohio State (22–5)	Oklahoma (22–5)	Gonzaga (27–3)	Oklahoma (25–6)	16.
17.	Maryland	Baylor (2–0)	Utah (4–0)	Michigan (7–0)	Oregon (6–1)	Creighton (8–1)	Arkansas (13–0)	Oregon (10–2)	Oklahoma (11–1)	Michigan (13–3)	North Carolina (12–5)	Gonzaga (19–2)	Gonzaga (21–2)	Arizona (18–5)	Texas (20–6)	UCLA (21–6)	Michigan (21–8)	UCLA (25–9)	Iowa State (22–9)	17.
18.	Baylor	Arizona (2–0)	Oregon (3–0)	Louisville (5–2)	Creighton (7–1)	Baylor (7–2)	Arizona (9–1)	Arizona (10–1)	Oregon (11–3)	Baylor (12–3)	Iowa State (11–4)	Iowa State (13–4)	Michigan (17–5)	UCLA (18–6)	Arizona (19–6)	Gonzaga (25–3)	North Carolina (20–9)	Michigan (22–9)	Michigan (22–9)	18.
19.	Arizona	Maryland (2–1)	Texas (1–3)	Oregon (5–1)	Baylor (6–2)	Michigan (9–1)	Michigan (10–1)	Gonzaga (12–2)	Duke (13–1)	Oklahoma (12–2)	Arizona (14–4)	Arizona (15–4)	Villanova (18–4)	Florida State (20–5)	North Carolina (18–7)	Texas (21–7)	UCLA (22–8)	North Carolina (21–10)	Gonzaga (28–4)	19.
20.	Oregon	Creighton (2–0)	UCLA (5–0)	Maryland (6–2)	Maryland (7–3)	Arizona (7–1)	Kansas (10–0)	Oklahoma (10–1)	Gonzaga (14–2)	Gonzaga (16–2)	NC State (13–5)	NC State (15–5)	Oklahoma (16–4)	Texas (18–6)	Gonzaga (23–3)	Iowa State (17–7)	Colorado (22–7)	Colorado (23–8)	North Carolina (21–10)	20.
21.	Creighton	Oregon (2–0)	Baylor (3–1)	Baylor (5–2)	Arkansas (10–0)	Arkansas (12–0)	Creighton (8–2)	Creighton (8–3)	Kansas (11–1)	Oregon (12–4)	Illinois (15–3)	Villanova (18–3)	Middle Tennessee (18–2)	Iowa State (15–6)	Colorado (20–5)	Colorado (21–6)	Arizona (21–8)	UNLV (28–2)	Colorado (23–8)	21.
22.	Nebraska	Nebraska (2–0)	Michigan (4–0)	Texas (3–3)	Gonzaga (7–2)	Kansas (9–0)	Gonzaga (10–2)	Kansas (10–1)	North Carolina (9–4)	North Carolina (10–5)	Villanova (16–3)	Illinois (16–4)	Arizona (16–5)	NC State (16–6)	Iowa State (15–7)	North Carolina (19–8)	UNLV (27–2)	Washington State (23–10)	UNLV (31–2)	22.
23.	South Dakota State	Michigan (2–0)	Tennessee (2–3) т	Gonzaga (5–1)	Oklahoma (7–1)	Gonzaga (9–2)	Oklahoma (9–1)	Baylor (9–3)	Baylor (10–3)	Kansas (12–2)	Oregon (13–5)	Middle Tennessee (16–2)	Florida State (19–5)	Gonzaga (22–3)	UNLV (24–2)	Florida State (22–7)	Iowa State (18–8)	Tennessee (23–11)	Washington State (23–10)	23.
24.	Princeton	Villanova (2–0)	Villanova (4–0) т	Marquette (6–1)	Kansas State (8–1)	Oklahoma (8–1)	Baylor (8–3)	Arkansas (13–2)	St. John's (13–0)	Illinois (14–3)	Colorado (14–3)	Florida State (18–4)	Texas (16–6)	South Florida (22–4)	Florida State (20–7)	UNLV (25–2)	Middle Tennessee (23–4)	Arizona (21–9)	Tennessee (23–11)	24.
25.	Michigan	Utah (3–0)	Kansas State (5–0)	Villanova (6–1)	Villanova (7–2)	Villanova (9–2)	St. John's (11–0)	St. John's (12–0)	Creighton (9–4)	Villanova (14–3)	Texas (13–5)	Colorado (15–4)	South Florida (20–4)	Colorado (18–5)	USC (19–6)	Illinois (20–7) т Middle Tennessee (22–4) т	South Florida (25–5)	Middle Tennessee (25–4)	Arizona (21–9)	25.
	Preseason Oct 18	Week 2 Nov 14	Week 3 Nov 21	Week 4 Nov 28	Week 5 Dec 5	Week 6 Dec 12	Week 7 Dec 19	Week 8 Dec 26	Week 9 Jan 2	Week 10 Jan 9	Week 11 Jan 16	Week 12 Jan 23	Week 13 Jan 30	Week 14 Feb 6	Week 15 Feb 13	Week 16 Feb 20	Week 17 Feb 27	Week 18 Mar 6	Week 19 Mar 13	
		Dropped: No. 23 South Dakota State; No. 24 Princeton	Dropped: No. 16 Oklahoma; No. 22 Nebraska	Dropped: No. 23 Tennessee; No. 25 Kansas State	Dropped: No. 18 Louisville; No. 22 Texas; No. 24 Marquette	Dropped: No. 24 Kansas State	Dropped: No. 25 Villanova	None	Dropped: No. 24 Arkansas	Dropped: No. 24 St. John's; No. 25 Creighton	Dropped: No. 18 Baylor; No. 23 Kansas	Dropped: No. 23 Oregon; No. 25 Texas	Dropped: No. 22 Illinois; No. 25 Colorado	Dropped: No. 21 Middle Tennessee	Dropped: No. 22 NC State; No. 24 South Florida	Dropped: No. 25 USC	Dropped: No. 23 Florida State; No. 25 Illinois	Dropped: No. 23 Iowa State; No. 25 South Florida	Dropped: No. 25 Middle Tennessee	

== USA Today Coaches Poll ==
The Coaches Poll is the second-oldest poll still in use after the AP Poll. It is compiled by a rotating group of 31 college Division I head coaches. The Poll operates by Borda count. Each voting member ranks teams from 1 to 25. Each team then receives points for their ranking in reverse order: Number 1 earns 25 points, number 2 earns 24 points, and so forth. The points are then combined and the team with the highest points is then ranked No. 1; second highest is ranked No. 2 and so forth. Only the top 25 teams with points are ranked, with teams receiving first-place votes noted the quantity next to their name. The maximum points a single team can earn is 775.

	Preseason Oct 26	Week 2 Nov 15	Week 3 Nov 22	Week 4 Nov 29	Week 5 Dec 6	Week 6 Dec 13	Week 7 Dec 20	Week 8 Dec 27	Week 9 Jan 3	Week 10 Jan 10	Week 11 Jan 17	Week 12 Jan 24	Week 13 Jan 31	Week 14 Feb 7	Week 15 Feb 14	Week 16 Feb 21	Week 17 Feb 28	Week 18 Mar 7	Week 19 Mar 13	Final Apr 3	
1.	South Carolina (30)	South Carolina (2–0) (32)	South Carolina (4–0) (32)	South Carolina (6–0) (32)	South Carolina (8–0) (32)	South Carolina (9–0) (32)	South Carolina (11–0) (32)	South Carolina (12–0) (32)	South Carolina (14–0) (32)	South Carolina (16–0) (32)	South Carolina (18–0) (32)	South Carolina (20–0) (32)	South Carolina (21–0) (32)	South Carolina (23–0) (32)	South Carolina (25–0) (32)	South Carolina (27–0) (31)	South Carolina (29–0) (32)	South Carolina (32–0) (30)	South Carolina (32–0) (32)	LSU (34–2) (30)	1.
2.	Stanford (1)	Stanford (4–0)	Stanford (5–1)	Stanford (8–1)	Stanford (10–1)	Stanford (10–1)	Stanford (11–1)	Stanford (13–1)	Stanford (15–1)	Stanford (16–1)	Ohio State (18–0)	Stanford (19–2)	Stanford (21–2)	LSU (23–0)	Indiana (24–1)	Indiana (26–1) (1)	Indiana (26–2)	Indiana (27–3)	Indiana (27–3)	Iowa (31–7)	2.
3.	Texas	UConn (2–0)	UConn (3–0)	UConn (5–0)	Indiana (9–0)	Indiana (10–0)	Indiana (11–0)	Indiana (12–0)	Ohio State (15–0)	Ohio State (17–0)	Stanford (17–2)	LSU (20–0)	LSU (21–0)	Indiana (22–1)	Stanford (24–3)	Stanford (26–3)	LSU (27–1)	Iowa (26–6)	Iowa (26–6)	South Carolina (36–1)	3.
4.	Tennessee	Louisville (3–0)	Iowa State (4–0)	Indiana (7–0)	Ohio State (8–0)	Ohio State (10–0)	Ohio State (11–0)	Ohio State (13–0)	Notre Dame (12–1)	UConn (13–2)	LSU (18–0)	UConn (18–2)	UConn (20–2)	UConn (21–3)	LSU (23–1)	LSU (25–1)	Utah (25–3)	Stanford (28–5)т	Stanford (28–5)	Virginia Tech (31–5)	4.
5.	Louisville	Texas (1–1)	Indiana (5–0)	Ohio State (6–0)	Notre Dame (7–1)	Notre Dame (8–1)	Notre Dame (9–1)	Notre Dame (10–1)	UConn (11–2)	LSU (16–0)	UConn (15–2)	Ohio State (19–1)	Indiana (20–1)	Stanford (22–3)	Utah (23–2)	UConn (24–4)	Stanford (27–4)	LSU (28–2)т	Virginia Tech (27–4)	Maryland (28–7)	5.
6.	Iowa т	Iowa (3–0)	Ohio State (4–0)	North Carolina (6–0)	UConn (6–1)	Virginia Tech (10–0)	NC State (11–1)	NC State (11–1)	LSU (14–0)	Indiana (14–1)	Indiana (16–1)	Indiana (18–1)	Iowa (17–4)	Iowa (19–4)	UConn (22–4)	Iowa (22–5)	Maryland (24–5)	Virginia Tech (27–4)	LSU (28–2)	Ohio State (28–8)	6.
7.	UConn т	NC State (3–0)	Notre Dame (4–0)	Notre Dame (6–0)	Virginia Tech (8–0)	North Carolina (8–1)	North Carolina (9–1)	Virginia Tech (11–1)	Indiana (13–1)	Notre Dame (12–2)	Notre Dame (14–2)	Notre Dame (16–2)	Utah (19–2)	Utah (21–2)	Iowa (20–5)	Utah (23–3)	Iowa (23–6)	Maryland (25–6)	Maryland (25–6)	Indiana (28–4)	7.
8.	NC State	Iowa State (2–0)	Iowa (4–1)	Iowa State (5–1)	Iowa State (6–1)	NC State (9–1)	Virginia Tech (10–1)	UConn (9–2)	Utah (14–0)	Utah (14–1)	Utah (16–1)	Iowa (16–4)	Notre Dame (17–3)	Maryland (19–5)	Maryland (21–5)	Maryland (22–5)	Virginia Tech (24–4)	Utah (25–4)	UConn (29–5)	Utah (27–5)	8.
9.	Iowa State (1)	Indiana (3–0)	Virginia Tech (4–0)	Virginia Tech (6–0)	North Carolina (6–1)	UConn (7–2)	UConn (8–2)	LSU (12–0)	NC State (12–2)	Iowa (12–4)	Iowa (14–4)	Utah (17–2)	Maryland (18–4)	Virginia Tech (19–4)	Virginia Tech (20–4)	Virginia Tech (22–4)	UConn (26–5)	UConn (29–5)	Utah (25–4)	UConn (31–6)	9.
10.	Notre Dame	Ohio State (2–0)	North Carolina (4–0)	Iowa (5–2)	NC State (8–1)	LSU (9–0)	LSU (12–0)	Iowa (10–3)	Virginia Tech (12–2)	Arizona (14–2)	Virginia Tech (14–3)	Virginia Tech (16–3)	Ohio State (19–3)	Notre Dame (18–4)	Notre Dame (20–4)	Notre Dame (22–4)	Notre Dame (24–4)	Notre Dame (25–5)	Villanova (28–6)	Stanford (29–6)	10.
11.	Indiana	Notre Dame (2–0)	NC State (4–1)	NC State (6–1)	LSU (9–0)	Iowa (8–3)	Iowa (9–3)	Utah (12–0)	Iowa State (9–2)	Maryland (13–3)	Maryland (14–4)	Maryland (16–4)	Virginia Tech (17–4)	Duke (20–3)	Duke (22–3)	Oklahoma (22–4)	Villanova (26–5)	Villanova (28–6)	Notre Dame (25–5)	Notre Dame (27–6)	11.
12.	North Carolina	Tennessee (1–2)	Louisville (4–2)	LSU (7–0)	Arizona (7–0)	Iowa State (7–2)	Utah (10–0)	North Carolina (9–2)	Iowa (11–4)	NC State (13–3)	Oklahoma (14–2)	Oklahoma (16–2)	Iowa State (15–4)	Ohio State (20–4)	Oklahoma (20–4)	Duke (23–4)	Duke (24–5)	Oklahoma (24–5)	Ohio State (25–7)	Villanova (30–7)	12.
13.	Virginia Tech	North Carolina (2–0)	LSU (5–0)	Arizona (6–0)	Iowa (6–3)	Utah (8–0)	Iowa State (8–2)	UCLA (12–1)	Arizona (12–2)	Virginia Tech (13–3)	UCLA (15–3)	UCLA (17–3)	NC State (16–5)	Oklahoma (18–4)	Michigan (20–5)	Ohio State (23–5)	Oklahoma (22–5)	Ohio State (25–7)	Duke (25–6)	UCLA (27–10)	13.
14.	LSU	Virginia Tech (3–0)	Arizona (4–0)	Creighton (6–0)	Utah (7–0)	UCLA (9–1)	UCLA (11–1)	Iowa State (8–2)	Maryland (12–3)	UCLA (14–2)	Duke (16–1)	Arizona (15–4)	North Carolina (16–5)	Michigan (19–5)	Ohio State (21–5)	Arizona (21–6)	Ohio State (23–6)	Duke (25–6)	Oklahoma (25–6)	Louisville (26–12)	14.
15.	Ohio State	LSU (3–0)	Creighton (4–0)	Louisville (5–2)	UCLA (8–1)	Oregon (7–1)	Oregon (9–1)	Arizona (10–1)	UCLA (13–2)	Iowa State (10–3)	Arizona (14–4)	Iowa State (13–4)	Duke (18–3)	Arizona (18–5)	Villanova (22–4)	Villanova (23–5)	Gonzaga (27–3)	Gonzaga (28–3)	UCLA (25–9)	Colorado (25–9)	15.
16.	Oklahoma	Oklahoma (2–0)	Texas (2–3)	Utah (6–0)	Michigan (9–0)	Creighton (8–1)	Arizona (9–1)	Oregon (10–2)	Oklahoma (11–1)	Oklahoma (12–2)	Michigan (15–3)	Duke (17–2)	UCLA (17–5)	North Carolina (17–6)	UCLA (20–6)	UCLA (21–7)	UCLA (22–8)	Texas (23–8)	Texas (25–9)	Duke (26–7)	16.
17.	Baylor	Baylor (2–0)	Maryland (4–1)	UCLA (7–0)	Oregon (6–1)	Arizona (7–1)	Maryland (9–3)	Maryland (10–3)	Oregon (11–3)	Baylor (12–3)	Iowa State (11–4)	Michigan (16–4)	Oklahoma (16–4)	UCLA (18–6	North Carolina (18–7)	Michigan (20–7)	Texas (22–8)	UCLA (25–9)	Gonzaga (28–4)	Oklahoma (26–7)	17.
18.	Maryland	Arizona (2–0)	Oregon (4–0)	Texas (3–3)	Creighton (7–1)	Baylor (7–2)	Oklahoma (9–1)	Oklahoma (10–1)	North Carolina (9–4)	Oregon (12–4)	NC State (13–5)	NC State (15–5)	Gonzaga (21–2)	Villanova (20–4)	Arizona (19–6)	Gonzaga (25–3)	Michigan (21–8)	Michigan (22–9)	Michigan (22–9)	Miami (FL) (22–13)	18.
19.	Arizona	Oregon (3–0)	Utah (5–0)	Oregon (5–1)	Baylor (6–2)	Maryland (9–3)	Arkansas (13–0)	Michigan (11–1)	Michigan (12–2)	Duke (14–1)	Gonzaga (17–2)	North Carolina (14–5)	Michigan (17–5)	Iowa State (15–6)	Gonzaga (23–3)	Iowa State (17–7)	North Carolina (20–9)	North Carolina (21–10)	North Carolina (21–10)	Texas (26–10)	19.
20.	Oregon	Creighton (2–0)	Baylor (3–1)	Michigan (7–0)	Oklahoma (7–1)	Oklahoma (8–1)	Creighton (8–2)	Gonzaga (12–2)	Gonzaga (14–2)	Michigan (13–3)	North Carolina (12–5)	Gonzaga (19–2)	Arizona (16–5)	NC State (16–7)	Iowa State (16–7)	Texas (21–7)	Arizona (21–8)	South Florida (26–5)	Iowa State (22–9)	Tennessee (25–12)	20.
21.	Creighton	Maryland (2–1)	UCLA (6–0)	Maryland (6–2)	Maryland (7–3)	Michigan (9–1)	Michigan (10–1)	Creighton (8–3)	Baylor (10–3)	Gonzaga (16–2)	Oregon (13–5)	Villanova (18–3)	Villanova (18–4)	South Florida (22–4)	Colorado (21–5)	North Carolina (19–8)	Colorado (23–7)	Colorado (23–8)	Colorado (23–8)	North Carolina (22–11)	21.
22.	Nebraska	Nebraska (2–0)	Oklahoma (4–1)	Baylor (5–2)	Arkansas (10–0)	Arkansas (12–0)	Gonzaga (11–2)	Baylor (9–3)	Duke (13–1)	North Carolina (10–5)	Arkansas (17–3)	Illinois (16–4)	South Florida (20–4)	Gonzaga (22–3)	Texas (20–7)	Colorado (22–6)	South Florida (25–5)	Arizona (21–9)	Florida Gulf Coast (32–3)	Ole Miss (25–9)	22.
23.	Michigan	Michigan (2–0)	Michigan (4–0)	Oklahoma (5–1)	Gonzaga (7–2)	Gonzaga (9–2)	Baylor (8–3)	Arkansas (13–2)	St. John's (13–0)	Arkansas (16–3)	Illinois (15–3)	Oregon (13–6)	Middle Tennessee (18–2)	Texas (18–6)	South Florida (22–5)	South Florida (24–5)	Iowa State (18–8)	Florida Gulf Coast (30–3)	Arizona (21–9)	Michigan (23–10)	23.
24.	South Dakota State	Utah (3–0)	Tennessee (2–4)	Marquette (6–1)	Louisville (5–4)	Kansas (9–0)	Kansas (10–0)	St. John's (12–0)	Creighton (9–4)	Illinois (14–3)	Baylor (12–5)	Arkansas (17–5)	Illinois (17–5)	Florida State (20–5)	NC State (17–8)	Florida Gulf Coast (26–3)	Florida Gulf Coast (28–3)	UNLV (29–2)	South Florida (26–5)	Florida Gulf Coast (33–4)	24.
25.	Princeton	Florida Gulf Coast (2–0)	Marquette (5–1)	Gonzaga (6–1)	Kansas State (8–1)	Louisville (7–4)	Virginia (12–0)	Kansas (10–1)	Kansas (11–1)	Kansas (12–2)	Texas (13–5)	South Florida (18–4)	Texas (16–6)	Colorado (19–5)	UNLV (24–2)	UNLV (25–2)	UNLV (27–2)	Iowa State (19–9)	UNLV (31–2)	Iowa State (22–10)	25.
	Preseason Oct 26	Week 2 Nov 15	Week 3 Nov 22	Week 4 Nov 29	Week 5 Dec 6	Week 6 Dec 13	Week 7 Dec 20	Week 8 Dec 27	Week 9 Jan 3	Week 10 Jan 10	Week 11 Jan 17	Week 12 Jan 24	Week 13 Jan 31	Week 14 Feb 7	Week 15 Feb 14	Week 16 Feb 21	Week 17 Feb 28	Week 18 Mar 7	Week 19 Mar 13	Final Apr 3	
		Dropped: No. 24 South Dakota State; No. 25 Princeton	Dropped: No. 22 Nebraska; No. 25 Florida Gulf Coast	Dropped: No. 24 Tennessee	Dropped: No. 18 Texas; No. 24 Marquette	Dropped: No. 25 Kansas State	Dropped: No. 25 Louisville	Dropped: No. 25 Virginia	Dropped: No. 23 Arkansas	Dropped: No. 23 St. John's; No. 24 Creighton	Dropped: No. 25 Kansas	Dropped: No. 24 Baylor; No. 25 Texas	Dropped: No. 23 Oregon; No. 24 Arkansas	Dropped: No. 23 Middle Tennessee; No. 24 Illinois	Dropped: No. 24 Florida State	Dropped: No. 24 NC State	None	None	None	Dropped: No. 17 Gonzaga; No. 23 Arizona; No. 24 South Florida; No. 25 UNLV	

== See also ==
- 2022–23 NCAA Division I men's basketball rankings
