= 2021–22 Pac-12 Conference women's basketball season =

2021–22 Pac–12 women's basketball season
- League: NCAA Division I
- Sport: Basketball
- Teams: 12
- TV partner(s): ESPN, ESPN2, ESPNU, Pac-12 Network

Regular season
- Regular season champions: Stanford
- Season MVP: Cameron Brink & Haley Jones, Stanford

Pac-12 tournament
- Champions: Stanford
- Runners-up: Utah

Pac-12 women's basketball seasons
- ← 2020–21 2022–23 →

2021–22 Pac-12 Conference women's basketball standings
	Conf.				Overall
Team	W		L	PCT	W		L	PCT
No. 2 Stanford †	16	–	0	1.000	32	–	4	.889
Oregon	11	–	6	.647	20	–	12	.625
Washington State	11	–	6	.647	19	–	11	.633
No. 19 Arizona	10	–	6	.625	21	–	8	.724
Colorado	9	–	7	.563	22	–	9	.710
Utah	8	–	7	.533	21	–	12	.636
UCLA	8	–	8	.500	18	–	13	.581
Oregon State	6	–	9	.400	17	–	14	.548
Arizona State	4	–	9	.308	12	–	14	.462
USC	5	–	12	.294	12	–	16	.429
California	2	–	10	.167	11	–	13	.458
Washington	2	–	12	.143	7	–	16	.304
† 2022 Pac-12 Tournament winner Rankings from AP poll

The 2021–22 Pac-12 Conference women's basketball season began with practices in October followed by the 2021–22 NCAA Division I women's basketball season which started on November 9. Conference play began on December 31. This is the tenth season under the Pac–12 Conference name and the 36th since the conference first sponsored women's sports, including basketball, in the 1986–87 school year.

The Pac-12 tournament took place from March 2–6 at the Michelob Ultra Arena in Paradise, Nevada.

== Pre-season ==
=== Recruiting classes ===
Rankings
Team	ESPN	Signees
Arizona	—	
Arizona State	―	
California	―	
Colorado	-	
Oregon	―	
Oregon State	―	
Stanford	-	
UCLA	-	
USC	―	
Utah	―	
Washington	-	
Washington State	-	

=== Preseason watchlists ===
Below is a table of notable preseason watch lists.

Wooden	Naismith	Lieberman	Drysdale	Miller	McClain	Leslie	Wade
Cameron Brink – Stanford; Mya Hollingshed – Colorado; Lexie Hull – Stanford; Haley Jones – Stanford; Taylor Jones – Oregon State; Charlisse Leger-Walker – Washington State; Charisma Osborne – UCLA; Te-Hina Paopao – Oregon; Alissa Pili – USC; Nyara Sabally – Oregon	Cameron Brink – Stanford; Lexie Hull – Stanford; Haley Jones – Stanford; Taylor Jones – Oregon State; Charlisse Leger-Walker – Washington State; Nancy Mulkey – Washington; Charisma Osborne – UCLA; Alissa Pili – USC; Nyara Sabally – Oregon; Sam Thomas – Arizona	Gina Conti – UCLA; Dru Gylten – Utah; Te-Hina Paopao – Oregon	Taylor Chavez – Arizona; Lexie Hull – Stanford; Charlisse Leger-Walker – Washington State; Charisma Osborne – UCLA; Sydney Parrish – Oregon	Haley Jones – Stanford; Sam Thomas – Arizona	Cameron Brink – Stanford; Taylor Jones – Oregon State; Alissa Pili – USC; Nyara Sabally – Oregon	Fran Belibi – Stanford; Nancy Mulkey – Washington; Bella Murekatete – Washington State	Cameron Brink – Stanford; Haley Jones – Stanford; Charlisse Leger-Walker – Washington State; Charisma Osborne – UCLA; Nyara Sabally – Oregon

=== Pac-12 Media days ===
The Pac-12 will conduct its 2021 Pac-12 media days at the Pac-12 Studio, in San Francisco, California, on October 13, 2021 (Pac-12 Network).

The teams and representatives in respective order were as follows:

- Pac-12 Commissioner – George Kliavkoff
- Deputy Commissioner and Chief Operating Officer(MBB) – Jamie Zaninovich
- Arizona –
- Arizona State –
- California –
- Colorado –
- Oregon –
- Oregon State –
- Stanford –
- UCLA –
- USC –
- Utah –
- Washington –
- Washington State –

Women's Basketball Preseason Poll (Coaches)
Place	Team	Points	First place votes
1.	Stanford	121	11
2.	Oregon	108	1
3.	UCLA	101	--
4.	Oregon State	86	--
5.	Arizona	83	--
6.	Washington State	70	--
7.	Colorado	65	--
8.	Arizona State	47	--
9.	USC	45	--
T10.	Utah	25	--
T11.	Washington	25	--
12.	California	16	--

Women's Basketball Preseason Poll (Media)
Place	Team	Points	First place votes
1.	Stanford	312	26
2.	Oregon	275	--
3.	UCLA	250	--
4.	Oregon State	236	--
5.	Arizona	215	--
6.	Washington State	178	--
7.	Colorado	142	--
8.	Arizona State	129	--
9.	USC	125	--
T10.	Utah	66	--
11.	Washington	60	--
12.	California	40	--

=== Pac-12 Preseason All-Conference ===
Name	School	Pos.	Yr.	Ht.	Hometown (Last School)
Taylor Jones	Oregon State	Jr.	F	6'4	Forney, TX (Dallas Christian School)
Talia von Oelhoffen	Oregon State	So.	F	5'11	Pasco, WA (Chiawana HS)
Cameron Brink	Stanford	So.	F	6'4	Beaverton, OR (Mountainside HS)
Lexie Hull	Stanford	Sr.	F	6'0	Spokane, WA (Central Valley HS)
Haley Jones	Stanford	Jr.	G	6'1	Santa Cruz, CA (Archbishop Mitty HS)
Te-Hina Paopao	Oregon	So.	G	5'9	Oceanside, CA (La Jolla Country Day School)
Alissa Pili	USC	So.	F	6'0	Anchorage, AK (Dimond HS)
Mya Hollingshed	Colorado	Sr.	G/F	6'3	Houston, TX (Bellaire HS)
Sedona Prince	Oregon	R-Jr.	F/C	6'7	Liberty Hill, TX (Texas)
Endyia Rogers	Oregon	Jr.	G	5'7	Dallas, TX (USC)
Charisma Osborne	UCLA	Jr.	G	5'9	Moreno Valley, CA (Windward School)
Sam Thomas	Arizona	GS.	F	6'0	Bloomfield Hills, MI (Centennial HS)
Cate Reese	Arizona	Sr.	F	6'2	Cypress, TX (Cypress Woods HS)
Nyara Sabally	Oregon	Jr.	F	6'5	Berlin, Germany (Rotteck Gymnasium)
Charlisse Leger-Walker	Washington State	So.	G	5'10	Waikato, New Zealand (St. Peter's School)

Honorable Mention
Kennedy Brown (OSU); Gina Conti (UCLA); Natalie Chou (UCLA); Dalayah Daniels (CAL); Dru Gylten (UTAH); Taya Hanson (ASU); Krystal Leger-Walker (WSU) Brynna Maxwell (UTAH); Nancy Mulkey (WASH); Jaylyn Sherrod (COLO); Anna Wilson (STAN).

=== Midseason watchlists ===
Below is a table of notable midseason watch lists.

Wooden	Naismith	Liberman	Drysdale	Miller	McClain	Leslie	Wade
Cameron Brink – Stanford; Haley Jones – Stanford; Charisma Osborne – UCLA	Cameron Brink – Stanford; Haley Jones – Stanford; Charisma Osborne – UCLA; Cate Reese – Arizona	None	Charlisse Leger-Walker – Washington State; Charisma Osborne – UCLA	Haley Jones – Stanford	Cameron Brink – Stanford; Nyara Sabally – Oregon	None	

=== Final watchlists ===
Below is a table of notable year end watch lists.

Wooden	Naismith	Liberman	Drysdale	Miller	McClain	Leslie	Wade

== Regular season ==
The Schedule will be released in late October. Before the season, it was announced that for the seventh consecutive season, all regular season conference games and conference tournament games would be broadcast nationally by ESPN Inc. family of networks including ABC, ESPN, ESPN2 and ESPNU, and the Pac-12 Network.

=== Early season tournaments ===
Team	Tournament	Finish
Arizona	Paradise Jam	1st
Arizona State	Cancún Challenge	T-3rd (Mayan)
California	Raising the B.A.R. Invitational	–
Colorado	Rocky Mountain Hoops Classic	–
Oregon	Battle 4 Atlantis	3rd
Oregon State	Daytona Beach Invitational	—
Stanford	Baha Mar Hoops Pink Flamingo	–
UCLA	Gulf Coast Showcase	7th
USC	Cancún Challenge	T-2nd (Rivera)
Utah	Rainbow Wahine Showdown	–
Washington	Goombay Slapsh	–
Washington State	Baha Mar Hoops Pink Flamingo	–

=== Records against other conferences ===
2021–22 records against non-conference foes as of (November 27, 2021):

Regular season

Power Conferences	Record
ACC	4–4
Big East	5–0
Big Ten	3–2
Big 12	2–2
SEC	1–2
Power Conferences Total	15–10
Other NCAA Division 1 Conferences	Record
American	1–4
America East	0–0
A-10	2–1
ASUN	1–0
Big Sky	7–0
Big South	0–0
Big West	10–1
CAA	0–0
C-USA	2–0
Horizon	0–0
Ivy League	1–0
MAAC	2–0
MAC	1–1
MEAC	1–0
MVC	0–1
Mountain West	5–0
NEC	0–0
OVC	0–0
Patriot	0–0
SoCon	2–0
Southland	0–0
SWAC	2–0
The Summit	1–1
Sun Belt	0–0
WAC	4–0
WCC	10–3
Other Division I Total	51–12
Division II Total	0–0
NCAA Division I Total	66–22

Post Season

Power Conferences	Record
ACC	0–0
Big East	0–0
Big Ten	0–0
Big 12	0–0
SEC	0–0
Power Conferences Total	0–0
Other NCAA Division 1 Conferences	Record
American	0–0
America East	0–0
A-10	0–0
ASUN	0–0
Big Sky	0–0
Big South	0–0
Big West	0–0
CAA	0–0
C-USA	0–0
Horizon	0–0
Ivy League	0–0
MAAC	0–0
MAC	0–0
MEAC	0–0
MVC	0–0
Mountain West	0–0
NEC	0–0
OVC	0–0
Patriot League	0–0
SoCon	0–0
Southland	0–0
SWAC	0–0
The Summit	0–0
Sun Belt	0–0
WAC	0–0
WCC	0–0
Other Division I Total	0–0
NCAA Division I Total	0–0

=== Record against ranked non-conference opponents ===
This is a list of games against ranked opponents only (rankings from the AP Poll):

Date	Visitor	Home	Site	Significance	Score	Conference record
Nov 12	No. 6 Louisville	No. 22 Arizona†	Sanford Pentagon ● Sioux Falls, SD	Mammoth Sports Construction Invitational	61–59	1–0
Nov 14	No. 25 Texas	No. 3 Stanford	Maples Pavilion ● Stanford, CA	–	56–61	1–1
Nov 20	No. 10 Louisville	Washington	Alaska Airlines Arena ● Seattle, WA	–	53–61	1–2
Nov 21	No. 1 South Carolina	No. 9 Oregon †	Imperial Arena ● Nassau, Bahamas	Battle 4 Atlantis	63–80	1–3
Nov 22	No. 9 Oregon	No. 23 South Florida †	Imperial Arena ● Nassau, Bahamas	Battle 4 Atlantis	62–71	1–4
Nov 25	No. 7 Stanford	No. 4 Indiana †	Baha Mar Convention Center ● Nassau, Bahamas	Baha Mar Hoops Pink Flamingo	69–66	2–5
Nov 26	No. 6 Baylor	Arizona State †	Moon Palace Golf & Spa Resort ● Cancún, MX	Cancún Challenge	52–62	2–6
Nov 26	No. 18 South Florida	No. 7 Stanford †	Baha Mar Convention Center ● Nassau, Bahamas	Baha Mar Hoops Pink Flamingo	54–57	2–7
Nov 26	No. 12 Michigan	No. 16 Oregon State †	Ocean Center ● Daytona Beach, FL	Daytona Beach Invitational	52–61	2–8
Nov 27	Rutgers	No. 9 Arizona†	Sports and Fitness Center ● Saint Thomas, U.S. Virgin Islands	Paradise Jam	80–44	8–7
Nov 27	No. 2 Maryland	No. 7 Stanford†	Baha Mar Convention Center ● Nassau, Bahamas	Baha Mar Hoops Pink Flamingo	86–67	9–7
Nov 27	No. 5 NC State	Washington State†	Baha Mar Convention Center ● Nassau, Bahamas	Baha Mar Hoops Pink Flamingo	34–62	9–8
Nov 27	Notre Dame	No. 16 Oregon State†	Ocean Center ● Daytona Beach, FL	Daytona Beach Invitational	62–64	9–9
Dec 11	UCLA	No. 3 UConn†	Prudential Center ● Champaign, IL	Never Forget Tribute Classic	61–71	9–10
Dec 12	No. 23 Oregon State	Villanova	Finneran Pavilion ● Villanova, PA	–	52–56	9–11
Dec 18	Stanford	Tennessee	Thompson-Boling Arena ● Knoxville, TN	–	74–63	10–11
Dec 21	Stanford	South Carolina	Colonial Life Arena ● Columbia, SC	–	61–65	10–12

Team rankings are reflective of AP poll when the game was played, not current or final ranking

† denotes game was played on neutral site

=== Conference schedule ===
This table summarizes the head-to-head results between teams in conference play.

	Arizona	Arizona State	California	Colorado	Oregon	Oregon State	Stanford	UCLA	USC	Utah	Washington	Washington State
vs. Arizona	–	0–0	0–0	0–1	1–1	0–2	1–0	0–1	1–0	0–1	0–0	0–1
vs. Arizona State	0–0	–	0–0	0–0	0–0	0–0	0–0	0–0	0–0	0–0	0–0	0–0
vs. California	0–0	0–0	–	0–0	0–0	0–0	0–0	0–0	0–0	0–0	0–0	1–0
vs. Colorado	0–0	0–0	0–0	–	0–0	0–0	0–0	0–0	0–0	0–0	0–0	0–0
vs. Oregon	0–0	0–0	0–0	0–0	–	0–0	0–0	0–0	0–0	0–0	0–0	0–0
vs. Oregon State	0–0	0–0	0–0	0–0	0–0	–	0–0	0–0	0–0	0–0	0–0	0–0
vs. Stanford	0–0	0–0	0–0	0–0	0–0	0–0	–	0–0	0–0	0–0	0–0	0–0
vs. UCLA	0–0	0–0	0–0	0–0	0–0	0–0	0–0	–	0–0	0–0	0–0	0–0
vs. USC	0–0	0–0	0–0	0–0	0–0	0–0	0–0	0–0	–	0–0	0–0	0–0
vs. Utah	0–0	0–0	0–0	0–0	0–0	0–0	0–0	0–0	0–0	–	0–0	0–0
vs. Washington	0–0	0–0	0–0	0–0	0–0	0–0	0–0	0–0	0–0	0–0	–	0–0
vs. Washington State	0–0	0–0	0–1	0–0	0–0	0–0	0–0	0–0	0–0	0–0	0–0	–
Total	0–0	0–0	0–1	0–1	1–1	0–2	1–0	0–1	1–0	0–1	0–0	1–1

=== Points scored ===
Team	For	Against	Difference
Arizona	1418	1113	305
Arizona State	1160	1052	108
California	1067	1009	58
Colorado	0	0	0
Oregon	0	0	0
Oregon State	0	0	0
Stanford	0	0	0
UCLA	0	0	0
USC	0	0	0
Utah	0	0	0
Washington	0	0	0
Washington State	0	0	0

Through January 23, 2022

=== Rankings ===
	Improvement in ranking
	Drop in ranking
RV	Received votes but were not ranked in Top 25
NV	No votes received

Team	Poll	Pre	Wk 2	Wk 3	Wk 4	Wk 5	Wk 6	Wk 7	Wk 8	Wk 9	Wk 10	Wk 11	Wk 12	Wk 13	Wk 14	Wk 15	Wk 16	Wk 17	Wk 18	Wk 19	Final
Arizona	AP	22	11	9	7																
Arizona	C	15	12^	11																	
Arizona State	AP	NV																			
Arizona State	C																				
California	AP	NV																			
California	C																				
Colorado	AP	RV																			
Colorado	C																				
Oregon	AP	10	9	15	19																
Oregon	C	9	13^	16																	
Oregon State	AP	14	15	16	23																
Oregon State	C	18	19^	21																	
Stanford	AP	3 (5)	7	7	4																
Stanford	C	2 (13)	5^	4																	
UCLA	AP	20	20	19																	
UCLA	C	14	15^	23																	
USC	AP	RV																			
USC	C																				
Utah	AP	NV																			
Utah	C																				
Washington	AP	NV																			
Washington	C																				
Washington State	AP	NV																			
Washington State	C																				

== Head coaches ==
=== Coaches ===
Note: Stats shown are before the beginning of the season. Pac-12 records are from time at current school.

Team	Head coach	Previous job	Seasons at school	Record at school	Pac-12 record	Pac-12 titles	NCAA tournaments	NCAA Final Fours	NCAA Championships
Arizona	Adia Barnes	Washington (assistant)	6th	89–66 (.574)	39–50 (.438)	0	1	1	0
Arizona State	Charli Turner Thorne	Northern Arizona	25th	476–280 (.630)	243–181 (.573)	2	14	0	0
California	Charmin Smith	New York Liberty (assistant)	3rd	13–35 (.271)	4–27 (.129)	0	0	0	0
Colorado	JR Payne	Santa Clara	6th	72–75 (.490)	25–63 (.284)	0	0	0	0
Oregon	Kelly Graves	Gonzaga	8th	172–62 (.735)	82–43 (.656)	3	4	1	0
Oregon State	Scott Rueck	George Fox	12th	240–113 (.680)	121–70 (.634)	3	7	1	0
Stanford	Tara VanDerveer	Ohio State	36th	973–204 (.827)	531–91 (.854)	25	32	13	3
UCLA	Cori Close	Florida State (AHC)	11th	215–110 (.662)	115–63 (.646)	0	6	0	0
USC	Lindsay Gottlieb	Cleveland Cavaliers (assistant)	1st	0–0 (–)	0–0 (–)	0	8	0	0
Utah	Lynne Roberts	Pacific	7th	91–87 (.511)	40–69 (.367)	0	0	0	0
Washington	Tina Langley	Rice	1st	0–0 (–)	0–0 (–)	0	0	0	0
Washington State	Kamie Ethridge	Northern Colorado	4th	32–53 (.376)	17–38 (.309)	0	0	0	0

Notes:

- Pac-12 records, conference titles, etc. are from time at current school and are through the end the 2020–21 season.
- NCAA tournament appearances are from time at current school only.
- NCAA Final Fours and Championship include time at other schools

== Postseason ==
=== Pac-12 tournament ===
The conference tournament was played from March 2–6 at the Michelob Ultra Arena in Paradise, NV. The top four teams had a bye on the first day. Teams were seeded by conference record, with ties broken by record between the tied teams followed by record against the regular-season champion, if necessary.

First round Wednesday, March 2 P12N
5	Colorado	64
12	Washington	52
8	Oregon State	59
9	Arizona State	54
7	UCLA	73
10	USC	60
6	Utah	66
11	California	60

Quarterfinals; Thursday, March 3 P12N
4	Arizona	43
5	Colorado	45
1	Stanford	57
8	Oregon State	44
2	Oregon	63
7	UCLA	60
3	Washington State	59
6	Utah	70

Semifinals; Friday, March 4 P12N
5	Colorado	45
1	Stanford	71
2	Oregon	73
6	Utah	80

Championship Game; Sunday, March 6 ESPN2
1	Stanford	73
6	Utah	48

Note: * denotes overtime

=== All-Tournament Team ===
Name	Pos.	Year	Team
Cameron Brink	F	So.	Stanford
Jenna Johnson	F	Fr.	Utah
Haley Jones	G	Jr.	Stanford
Gianna Kneepkens	G	Fr.	Utah
Nyara Sabally	F	R-Jr.	Oregon
Anna Wilson	G	GSr.	Stanford

=== Most Outstanding Player ===
Name	Pos.	Year	Team
Haley Jones	G	Jr.	Stanford

==== NCAA tournament ====
Teams from the conference were selected to participate:

Seed	Region	School	First Four	First round	Second round	Sweet Sixteen	Elite Eight	Final Four	Championship
―	―	Stanford	–	―	―	–	–	–	–
	Bids	W-L (%):	0–0 (–)	0–0 (–)	0–0 (–)	0–0 (–)	0–0 (–)	0–0 (–)	TOTAL: 0–0 (–)

=== Women's National Invitation Tournament ===
Number from the conference were selected to participate:

Seed	Bracket	School	First round	Second round	Quarterfinals	Semifinals	Finals
		Oregon State	−	−	−	−	−
		UCLA	−	−	−	−	−
	Bid	W-L (%):	0–0 (–)	0–0 (–)	0–0 (–)	0–0 (–)	TOTAL: 0–0 (–)

Index to colors and formatting
Pac-12 member won
Pac-12 member lost

== Awards and honors ==
=== Players of the Week ===
Throughout the regular season, the Pac-12 offices honor 2 players based on performance by naming them player of the week and freshman of the week.

Week	Player of the Week	School	Freshman of the Week	School	Ref.
Nov 15	Cate Reese	Arizona	Jayda Curry	California	
Nov 22	Nyara Sabally	Oregon	Jayda Curry (2)	California	
Nov 29	Cameron Brink	Stanford	Jayda Curry (3)	California	
Dec 6	Natalie Chou	UCLA	Gianna Kneepkens	Utah	
Dec 13	Charlisse Leger-Walker	Washington State	Jenna Johnson	Utah	
Dec 20	Haley Jones	Stanford	Jayda Curry (4)	California	
Dec 27	Evelien Lutje Schipholt	California	Gianna Kneepkens (2)	Utah	
Jan 3	Haley Jones (2)	Stanford	Kiki Iriafen	Stanford	
Jan 10	Jaylyn Sherrod	Colorado	Rayah Marshall	USC	
Jan 17	Cameron Brink (2)	Stanford	Jenna Johnson (2)	Utah	
Jan 24	Charisma Osborne	UCLA	Gianna Kneepkens (3)	Utah	
Jan 31	Cameron Brink (3)	Stanford	Gianna Kneepkens (4)	Utah	
Feb 7	Cameron Brink (4)	Stanford	Jayda Curry (5)	California	
Feb 14	Jordyn Jenkin	Washington	Gianna Kneepkens (5)	Utah	
Feb 21	Johanna Teder	Washington State	Rayah Marshall (2)	USC	
Feb 28	Charisma Osborne (2)	UCLA	Jenna Johnson (3)	Utah	

==== Totals per School ====
School	Total
Utah	8
Stanford	7
California	6
UCLA	3
USC	2
Washington State	2
Arizona	1
Colorado	1
Oregon	1
Washington	1
Arizona State	0
Oregon State	0

=== All-District ===
The United States Basketball Writers Association (USBWA) named the following from the Pac-12 to their All-District Teams:

District VIII

All-District Team

District IX

Player of the Year

All-District Team

=== Conference awards ===
The Pac-12 presents two separate sets of major awards—one voted on by conference coaches and the other by media.

==== Individual awards ====
Coaches

2022 Pac-12 Women's Basketball Individual Awards
Award	Recipient(s)
Player of the Year	Haley Jones, Stanford
Coach of the Year	Tara VanDerveer, Stanford
Defensive Player of the Year	Cameron Brink, Stanford
Freshman of the Year	Gianna Kneepkens, Utah
Scholar-Athlete of the Year	Lexie Hull, Stanford
Most Improved Player of the Year	Jordyn Jenkins, USC & Bella Murekatete, Washington State
Sixth Player of the Year	Quay Miller, Colorado

Media

2022 Pac-12 Women's Basketball Individual Awards
Award	Recipient(s)
Player of the Year	Cameron Brink, Stanford
Coach of the Year	Kamie Ethridge, Washington State
Defensive Player of the Year	Cameron Brink, Stanford
Freshman of the Year	Jayda Curry, California
Most Improved Player of the Year	Jordyn Jenkins, USC
Sixth Player of the Year	Quay Miller, Colorado

==== All-Pac-12 ====
First Team

Name	School	Pos.	Yr.	Ht.	Hometown (Last School)
Cameron Brink	Stanford	F	So.	6−4	Beaverton, Ore. (Mountainside HS)
Mya Hollingshed	Colorado	F	R-Sr.	6−3	Houston, Tex. (Bellaire HS)
Lexie Hull	Stanford	G	Sr.	6−1	Spokane, Wash. (Central Valley HS)
Jordyn Jenkins	USC	F	So.	6−2	Kent, Wash. (Kentridge HS)
Haley Jones‡	Stanford	G	Jr.	6−1	Santa Cruz, Calif. (Archbishop Mitty)
Gianna Kneepkens	Utah	G	Fr.	5−11	Duluth, Minn. (Duluth Marshall HS)
Charlisse Leger-Walker	Washington State	G	So.	5−10	Waikato, New Zealand (St. Peter's School Cambridge)
Jade Loville	Arizona State	G/F	Sr.	5−11	Scottsdale, Ariz. (Skyline HS)
Charisma Osborne	UCLA	G	Jr.	5−9	Moreno Valley, Calif. (Windward School)
Te-Hina Paopao	Oregon	G	So.	5−9	Oceanside, Calif. (La Jolla Country Day School)
Cate Reese	Arizona	F	Sr.	6−2	Cypress, Tex. (Cypress Woods HS)
Endyia Rogers	USC	G	Jr.	5−7	Dallas, Tex. (Bishop Lynch HS)
Nyara Sabally	Oregon	F	R-Jr.	6−5	Berlin, Germany (SLZB)
IImar'I Thomas	UCLA	F	Gr.	5−10	Oakland, Calif. (Sacred Heart Cathedral Prep)
Talia von Oelhoffen	Oregon State	G	Fr.	5−11	Pasco, Wash. (Chiawana HS)

- ‡ Pac-12 Player of the Year
- ††† three-time All-Pac-12 First Team honoree
- †† two-time All-Pac-12 First Team honoree
- † two-time All-Pac-12 honoree

Honorable Mention:

- Jayda Curry, (CAL, G)
- Krystal Leger-Walker, (WSU, G)
- Kennady McQueen, (UTAH, G)
- Quay Miller, (COLO, C)
- Nancy Mulkey, (WASH, F)
- Jordan Sanders, (USC, F)
- Sam Thomas, (ARIZ, G/F)
- Haley Van Dyke, (WASH, F)

==== All-Freshman Team ====
Name	School	Pos.	Ht.
Jayda Curry	California	G	5−6
Jenna Johnson	Utah	F	6−2
Gianna Kneepkens‡	Utah	G	5−11
Rayah Marshall	USC	G/F	6−4
Kindyll Wetta	Colorado	G	5−9

† Pac-12 Player of the Year ‡ Pac-12 Freshman of the Year

Honorable Mention

- Izzy Anstey, (UCLA, F)
- Kiki Iriafen, (STAN, F)
- Greta Kampschroeder, (OSU, G)

==== All-Defensive Team ====
Name	School	Pos.	Yr.	Ht.
Cameron Brink‡	Stanford	F	So.	6−4
Lexie Hull	Stanford	G	Sr.	6−1
Sam Thomas	Arizona	G/F	Gr.	6−0
Kindyll Wetta	Colorado	G	Fr.	5−9
Anna Wilson	Stanford	G	GS	5−9

- † Pac-12 Player of the Year
- ‡Pac-12 Defensive Player of the Year
- †† two-time Pac-12 All-Defensive Team honoree

Honorable Mention

- Taya Corosdale, (OSU, G/F)
- Mael Gilles, (ASU, F)
- Krystal Leger-Walker, (WSU, G)
- Rayah Marshall, (USC, G/F)
- Leilani McIntosh, (CAL, G)
- Nancy Mulkey, (WASH, C)
- Charisma Osborne, (UCLA, G)
- Helena Pueyo, (ARIZ, G)
- Jordan Sanders, (USC, F)
- Maddie Scherr, (ORE, G)
- Haley Van Dyke, (WASH, F)

==== Scholar Athlete of the year ====
The Pac-12 moved to seasonal Academic Honor Rolls, discontinuing sport-by-sport teams, starting in 2019-20

Name	School	Pos.	Ht.	GPA	Major
Lexie Hull‡	Stanford	G	6−1	3.90	Management Science and Engineering

- ‡ indicates player was Pac-12 Scholar-Athlete of the Year
- †† two-time Pac-12 All-Academic honoree
- ††† three-time Pac-12 All-Academic honoree

== 2022 WNBA draft ==
Round	Pick	Player	Position	Nationality	Team	School/club team
1	5	Nyara Sabally	F	(Germany)	New York Liberty	Oregon
1	6	Lexie Hull	G	(United States)	Indiana Fever (from Dallas)	Stanford
1	8	Mya Hollingshed	F	(United States)	Las Vegas Aces (from Minnesota via Phoenix, New York, and Seattle) (Note: April 10, 2022: Minnesota to Las Vegas: Minnesota acquired Vegas's 1st and 2nd Round Picks in 2023; Las Vegas acquired the 8th and 13th Picks in 2022) (Note: February 10, 2021: Phoenix to New York: Phoenix acquired Kia Nurse and Megan Walker; New York acquired 2021 and 2022 first-round picks) (Note: February 10, 2021: New York to Seattle: New York acquired Natasha Howard; Seattle acquired 2021 first-round and 2022 second-round picks, and Phoenix's 2022 first-round pick) (Note: February 11, 2021: Seattle to Minnesota: Seattle acquired Mikiah Herbert Harrigan; Minnesota acquired Phoenix's 2022 first-round pick)	Colorado

== Home game attendance ==
Team	Stadium	Capacity	Game 1	Game 2	Game 3	Game 4	Game 5	Game 6	Game 7	Game 8	Game 9	Game 10	Game 11	Game 12	Game 13	Game 14	Game 15	Game 16	Game 17	Game 18	Total	Average	% of Capacity
Arizona	McKale Center	14,644	6,154	6,261	6,787	7,037	8,884	7,378	7,099	7,103	10,413†	7,505	–	–	–	–	–	–	–		74,621	7,462	50.95%
Arizona State	Desert Financial Arena	14,100	7,343†	4,111	2,795	1,700	1,530	0	0	2,190	2,201	2,640	2,912	–	–	–	–	–			27,422	2,492	17.68%
California	Haas Pavilion	11,858	1,591	–	–	–	–	–	–	–	–	–	–	–	–	–	–	–	–	–	–	–	–
Colorado	Coors Events Center	11,064	–	–	–	–	–	–	–	–	–	–	–	–	–	–	–	–	–	–	–	–	–
Oregon	Matthew Knight Arena	12,364	7,436	–	–	–	–	–	–	–	–	–	–	–	–	–	–	–	–		–	–	–
Oregon State	Gill Coliseum	9,604	–	–	–	–	–	–	–	–	–	–	–	–	–	–	–	–	–		–	–	–
Stanford	Maples Pavilion	7,233	2,696	–	–	–	–	–	–	–	–	–	–	–	–	–	–				–	–	–
UCLA	Pauley Pavilion	13,800	1,363	–	–	–	–	–	–	–	–	–	–	–	–	–	–	–	–		–	–	–
USC	Galen Center	10,258	1,147	–	–	–	–	–	–	–	–	–	–	–	–	–	–	–			–	–	–
Utah	Jon M. Huntsman Center	15,000	1,732	–	–	–	–	–	–	–	–	–	–	–	–	–	–	–			–	–	–
Washington	Alaska Airlines Arena	10,000	–	–	–	–	–	–	–	–	–	–	–	–	–	–	–	–	–		–	–	–
Washington State	Beasley Coliseum	11,671	713	–	–	–	–	–	–	–	–	–	–	–	–	–	–	–	–	–	–	–	–
Total		11,800																			102,043	4,859	41.17%

Bold – At or exceed capacity
†Season high

== See also ==
- 2021–22 Pac-12 Conference men's basketball season
