= 2022–23 Pac-12 Conference women's basketball season =

2022–23 Pac–12 women's basketball season
- League: NCAA Division I
- Sport: Basketball
- Teams: 12
- TV partner(s): ESPN, ESPN2, ESPNU, Pac-12 Network

Regular season

Pac-12 tournament
- Champions: Washington State
- Runners-up: UCLA
- Tournament MVP: Charlisse Leger-Walker

Pac-12 women's basketball seasons
- ← 2021–22 2023–24 →

2022–23 Pac-12 Conference women's basketball standings
| | Conf. | | | | Overall |
| Team | W | | L | PCT | W | | L | PCT |
|---|---|---|---|---|---|---|---|---|
| No. 8 Utah | 15 | – | 3 | .833 | 27 | – | 5 | .844 |
| No. 5 Stanford | 15 | – | 3 | .833 | 29 | – | 6 | .829 |
| No. 21 Colorado | 13 | – | 5 | .722 | 25 | – | 9 | .735 |
| No. 14 UCLA | 11 | – | 7 | .611 | 27 | – | 10 | .730 |
| No. 25 Arizona | 11 | – | 7 | .611 | 22 | – | 10 | .688 |
| USC | 11 | – | 7 | .611 | 21 | – | 10 | .677 |
| No. 23 Washington State † | 9 | – | 9 | .500 | 23 | – | 11 | .676 |
| Oregon | 7 | – | 11 | .389 | 20 | – | 15 | .571 |
| Washington | 7 | – | 11 | .389 | 19 | – | 15 | .559 |
| California | 4 | – | 14 | .222 | 13 | – | 17 | .433 |
| Oregon State | 4 | – | 14 | .222 | 13 | – | 18 | .419 |
| Arizona State | 1 | – | 17 | .056 | 8 | – | 20 | .286 |
† 2023 Pac-12 Tournament winner Rankings from AP poll

The 2022–23 Pac-12 Conference women's basketball season began with practices in October followed by the 2022–23 NCAA Division I women's basketball season, which started in November 2022. Conference play began in December 2022. This was the eleventh season under the Pac–12 Conference name and the 37th since the conference first sponsored women's sports, including basketball, in the 1986–87 school year.

The Pac-12 tournament took place in March 2023 at the Michelob Ultra Arena in Paradise, Nevada.

== Pre-season ==
=== Recruiting classes ===
Rankings
| Team | ESPN | Signees |
| Arizona | No. 6 | 4 |
| Arizona State | No. 73 | 1 |
| California | No. 38 | 1 |
| Colorado | No. 58 | 4 |
| Oregon | No. 4 | 4 |
| Oregon State | No. 5 | 2 |
| Stanford | No. 2 | 3 |
| UCLA | No. 3 | 4 |
| USC | No. 26 | 1 |
| Utah | No. 56 | 3 |
| Washington | No. 15 | 3 |
| Washington State | No. 81 | 1 |

=== Preseason watchlists ===
Below is a table of notable preseason watch lists.

| Player | Wooden | Naismith | Lieberman | Drysdale | Miller | McClain | Leslie | Wade |
| Francesca Belibi | | | | | | | ✓ | |
| Lauren Betts | | | | | | | ✓ | |
| Cameron Brink | ✓ | ✓ | | | | ✓ | | ✓ |
| Gina Conti | | | ✓ | | | | | |
| Jayda Curry | | ✓ | | | | | | |
| Emma Grothaus | | | | | | | ✓ | |
| Haley Jones | ✓ | ✓ | | | ✓ | | | ✓ |
| Gianna Kneepkens | | ✓ | | | ✓ | | | |
| Jade Loville | | ✓ | | ✓ | | | | |
| Esmery Martinez | | | | | | ✓ | | |
| Bella Murekatete | | | | | | | ✓ | |
| Charisma Osborne | ✓ | ✓ | | ✓ | | | | |
| Te-Hina Paopao | ✓ | ✓ | ✓ | | | | | |
| Alissa Pili | | | | | | ✓ | | |
| Sedona Prince | | | | | | | ✓ | |
| Cate Reese | ✓ | ✓ | | | | ✓ | | |
| Charlisse Leger-Walker | ✓ | | | ✓ | | | | |
| Quay Walker | | | | | | | ✓ | |

=== Preseason polls ===
AP
| Ranking | Team |
|---|---|
| 2 | Stanford |
| 19 | Arizona |
| 20 | Oregon |

USA Today coaches
| Ranking | Team |
|---|---|
| 2 | Stanford |
| 19 | Arizona |
| 20 | Oregon |

=== Pac-12 media days ===
The Pac-12 conducted its 2022 Pac-12 media days at the Pac-12 Studio, in San Francisco, California, on October 25, 2022 (Pac-12 Network).

The teams and representatives in respective order were as follows:

- Pac-12 commissioner – George Kliavkoff
- Deputy commissioner and chief operating officer (WBB) – Jamie Zaninovich
- Arizona – Adia Barnes (HC), Shaina Pellington & Helena Pueyo
- Arizona State – Natasha Adair (HC), Sydney Erikstrup & Jaddan Simmons
- California – Charmin Smith (HC), Jayda Curry & Kemery Martín
- Colorado – JR Payne (HC), Quay Miller & Jaylyn Sherrod
- Oregon – Kelly Graves (HC), Te-Hina Paopao & Endyia Rogers
- Oregon State – Scott Rueck (HC), Talia von Oelhoffen & Bendu Yeaney
- Stanford – Tara VanDerveer (HC), Cameron Brink & Haley Jones
- UCLA – Cori Close (HC), Charisma Osborne & Kiki Rice
- USC – Lindsay Gottlieb (HC), Rayah Marshall & Kadi Sissoko
- Utah – Lynne Roberts (HC), Gianna Kneepkens & Kennady McQueen
- Washington – Tina Langley (HC), Lauren Schwartz & Haley Van Dyke
- Washington State – Kamie Ethridge (HC), Charlisse Leger-Walker & Bella Murekatete

Women's Basketball Preseason Poll (Coaches)
| Place | Team | Points | First place votes |
|---|---|---|---|
| 1. | Stanford | 121 | 11 |
| 2. | Oregon | 101 | -- |
| 3 | Arizona | 100 | -- |
| 4. | UCLA | 91 | -- |
| 5. | Utah | 84 | 1 |
| 6. | Oregon State | 62 | -- |
| 7. | Washington State | 61 | -- |
| 8. | Colorado | 56 | -- |
| 9. | USC | 50 | -- |
| 10. | Washington | 28 | -- |
| 11. | California | 21 | -- |
| 12. | Arizona State | 18 | -- |

Women's Basketball Preseason Poll (Media)
| Place | Team | Points | First place votes |
|---|---|---|---|
| 1. | Stanford | 336 | 28 |
| 2. | Arizona | 291 | -- |
| 3 | Oregon | 275 | -- |
| 4. | UCLA | 237 | -- |
| 5. | Utah | 226 | -- |
| 6. | Oregon State | 181 | -- |
| 7. | Washington State | 170 | -- |
| 8. | Colorado | 145 | -- |
| 9. | USC | 105 | -- |
| 10. | Washington | 78 | -- |
| 11. | California | 71 | -- |
| 12. | Arizona State | 69 | -- |

=== Pac-12 Preseason All-Conference ===
| Name | School | Pos. | Yr. | Ht. | Hometown (last school) |
|---|---|---|---|---|---|
| Talia von Oelhoffen | Oregon State | Jr. | F | 5'11 | Pasco, WA (Chiawana HS) |
| Cameron Brink | Stanford | Jr. | F | 6'4 | Beaverton, OR (Mountainside HS) |
| Haley Jones | Stanford | Sr. | G | 6'1 | Santa Cruz, CA (Archbishop Mitty HS) |
| Te-Hina Paopao | Oregon | Jr. | G | 5'9 | Oceanside, CA (La Jolla Country Day School) |
| Jaylyn Sherrod | Colorado | Sr. | G | 5'7 | Birmingham, AL (Ramsay HS) |
| Sedona Prince† | Oregon | R-Sr. | F/C | 6'7 | Liberty Hill, TX (Texas/Liberty Hill HS) |
| Endyia Rogers | Oregon | Sr. | G | 5'7 | Dallas, TX (USC/Bishop Lynch HS) |
| Charisma Osborne | UCLA | Sr. | G | 5'9 | Moreno Valley, CA (Windward School) |
| Jade Loville | Arizona | GS. | F/G | 5'11 | Scottsdale, AZ (Arizona State/Skyline HS) |
| Shaina Pellington | Arizona | GS. | F | 5'7 | Pickering, Ontario, CAN (Oklahoma/Dunbarton HS) |
| Cate Reese | Arizona | GS. | F | 6'2 | Cypress, TX (Cypress Woods HS) |
| Charlisse Leger-Walker | Washington State | Jr. | G | 5'10 | Waikato, New Zealand (St. Peter's School) |
| Jenna Johnson | Utah | So. | F | 6'2 | Medina, MN (Wayzata HS) |
| Gianna Kneepkens | Utah | So. | F | 6'4 | Duluth, MN (Marshall School) |
| Jayda Curry | California | So. | G | 5'6 | Corona, CA (Centennial HS) |

Honorable Mention
Treasure Hunt (ASU); Evelien Lutje Schipholt (CAL); Rayah Marshall (USC); Leilani McIntosh (CAL); Kennady McQueen (UTAH); Quay Miller (COLO); Bella Murekatete (WSU); Kiki Rice (UCLA); Jaddan Simmons (ASU); Haley Van Dyke (WASH); Kindyll Wetta (COLO).

†Sedona Prince suffered a season-ending elbow injury on October 28th and chose to exhaust her remaining NCAA eligibility and pursue a professional basketball career.

=== Midseason watchlists ===
Below is a table of notable midseason watch lists.

| Player | Wooden | Naismith | Liberman | Drysdale | Miller | McClain | Leslie | Wade |
| Cameron Brink | ✓ | | | | | | | |
| Haley Jones | ✓ | | | | | | | |
| Charisma Osborne | ✓ | | | | | | | |

=== Final watchlists ===
Below is a table of notable year end watch lists.

| Wooden | Naismith | Liberman | Drysdale | Miller | McClain | Leslie | Wade |

== Regular season ==
The schedule was released in late October. Before the season, it was announced that for the seventh consecutive season, all regular season conference games and conference tournament games would be broadcast nationally by the ESPN Inc. family of networks, including ABC, ESPN, ESPN2 and ESPNU, and the Pac-12 Network.

=== Early season tournaments ===
| Team | Tournament | Finish |
|---|---|---|
| Arizona | USD Thanksgiving Classic | 1st |
| Arizona State | Goombay Spalsh | 2nd |
| California | LMU Thanksgiving Tournament | 1st |
| Colorado | Preseason WNIT | 3rd |
| Oregon | Phil Knight Invitational | 3rd |
| Oregon State | Phil Knight Legacy | 4th |
| Stanford | Rainbow Wahine Showdown | 1st |
| UCLA | Battle 4 Atlantis | 1st |
| USC | None | None |
| Utah | BahMar Hoops Pink Flamingo | 1st |
| Washington | Las Vegas Tournament | 2nd |
| Washington State | Northshore Showcase | 1st |

=== Records against other conferences ===
2022–23 records against non-conference foes for the 2022–23 season. Records shown for regular season only.

Regular season

| Power conferences | Record |
|---|---|
| ACC | 0–3 |
| Big East | 3–0 |
| Big Ten | 2–2 |
| Big 12 | 2–3 |
| SEC | 4–4 |
| Power conferences total | 11–12 |
| Other NCAA Division 1 conferences | Record |
| American | 0–0 |
| America East | 0–0 |
| A-10 | 0–0 |
| ASUN | 0–0 |
| Big Sky | 0–0 |
| Big South | 0–0 |
| Big West | 0–0 |
| CAA | 0–0 |
| C-USA | 0–0 |
| Horizon | 0–0 |
| Ivy League | 0–0 |
| MAAC | 0–0 |
| MAC | 0–0 |
| MEAC | 0–0 |
| MVC | 0–0 |
| Mountain West | 0–0 |
| NEC | 0–0 |
| OVC | 0–0 |
| Patriot League | 0–0 |
| SoCon | 0–0 |
| Southland | 0–0 |
| SWAC | 0–0 |
| The Summit | 0–0 |
| Sun Belt | 0–0 |
| WAC | 0–0 |
| WCC | 0–0 |
| Other Division I total | 0–0 |
| NCAA Division I total | 0–0 |

Post season

| Power conferences | Record |
|---|---|
| ACC | 0–0 |
| Big East | 0–0 |
| Big Ten | 0–0 |
| Big 12 | 0–0 |
| SEC | 0–0 |
| Power conferences total | 0–0 |
| Other NCAA Division 1 conferences | Record |
| American | 0–0 |
| America East | 0–0 |
| A-10 | 0–0 |
| ASUN | 0–0 |
| Big Sky | 0–0 |
| Big South | 0–0 |
| Big West | 0–0 |
| CAA | 0–0 |
| C-USA | 0–0 |
| Horizon | 0–0 |
| Ivy League | 0–0 |
| MAAC | 0–0 |
| MAC | 0–0 |
| MEAC | 0–0 |
| MVC | 0–0 |
| Mountain West | 0–0 |
| NEC | 0–0 |
| OVC | 0–0 |
| Patriot League | 0–0 |
| SoCon | 0–0 |
| Southland | 0–0 |
| SWAC | 0–0 |
| The Summit | 0–0 |
| Sun Belt | 0–0 |
| WAC | 0–0 |
| WCC | 0–0 |
| Other Division I total | 0–0 |
| NCAA Division I total | 0–0 |

=== Record against ranked non-conference opponents ===
This is a list of games against ranked opponents only (rankings from the AP Poll):

| Date | Visitor | Home | Site | Significance | Score | Conference record |
|---|---|---|---|---|---|---|
| Nov. 12 | California | No. 9 Notre Dame† | Enterprise Center ● St. Louis, MO | – | Notre Dame 90–89 | 0–1 |
| Nov. 16 | No. 16 Oklahoma | No. 25 Utah | Jon M. Huntsman Center ● Salt Lake City, UT | | Utah 124–78 | 1–1 |
| Nov 20 | No. 1 South Carolina | No. 2 Stanford | Maples Pavilion ● Stanford, CA | – | South Carolina 76–71 | 1–2 |
| Nov 24 | No. 8 North Carolina | No. 18 Oregon † | Chiles Center ● Portland, OR | Phil Knight Invitational | North Carolina 85–79 | 1–3 |
| Nov 25 | No. 4 Iowa | Oregon State † | Chiles Center ● Portland, OR | Phil Knight Legacy | Iowa 73–59 | 1–4 |
| Nov 25 | Colorado | No. 23 Tennessee | Thompson-Boling Arena ● Knoxville, TN | | Tennessee 69–51 | 1–5 |
| Nov 26 | No. 7 Notre Dame | Arizona State | Gateway Christian Academy ● Bimini, Bahamas | Goombay Splash | Notre Dame 85–65 | 1–6 |
| Nov 29 | No. 15 UCLA | No. 1 South Carolina | Colonial Life Arena ● Columbia, SC | – | South Carolina 73–64 | 1–6 |
| Dec 4 | No. 23 Gonzaga | No. 2 Stanford | Maples Pavilion ● Stanford, CA | – | Stanford 84–63 | 2–6 |
| Dec 18 | No. 11 LSU | Oregon State † | South Maui Community Park Gymnasium ● Kihei, HI | Maui Jim Maui Classic | LSU 87–55 | 2–7 |
| Dec 18 | No. 20 Arizona† | No. 18 Baylor | American Airlines Center ● Dallas, TX | Pac-12 Coast-to-Coast Challenge | Arizona 75–54 | 3–7 |
| Dec 20 | No. 17 Arkansas | No. 16 Oregon | Pechanga Arena ● San Diego, CA | NCAAW San Diego Invitational | Oregon 85–78 | 4–7 |
| Dec 20 | No. 21 Creighton | No. 2 Stanford | Maples Pavilion ● Stanford, CA | – | Stanford 72–59 | 5–7 |
| Dec 21 | No. 16 Ohio State | No. 16 Oregon | Pechanga Arena ● San Diego, CA | NCAAW San Diego Invitational | Ohio State 84–67 | 5–8 |

=== Pac-12/SWAC Legacy Series ===
On September 20, 2021, the Pac-12 and Southwestern Athletic Conference debuted the Pac-12/SWAC Legacy Series, an educational and basketball scheduling partnership between the two collegiate athletics conferences, to tip off the 2022–23 season. The Legacy Series incorporated an array of educational opportunities for competing teams and student-athletes featuring expert speakers and prominent alumni, community engagement, campus traditions, historic site visits, and book/film discussions. The Pac-12 won every game in the series, finishing with a 6−0 record against the SWAC schools.

| Date | Visitor | Home | Site | Significance | Score | Conference record |
|---|---|---|---|---|---|---|
| Nov. 11 | Grambling State | Arizona State | Desert Financial Arena ● Tempe, AZ | Pac-12/SWAC Legacy Series | ASU 62–49 | 1−0 |
| Nov. 13 | Prairie View A&M | Washington State | Beasley Coliseum ● Pullman, WA | Pac-12/SWAC Legacy Series | Washington State 89–61 | 2−0 |
| Nov 14 | No. 20 Oregon | Southern | F.G. Clark Activity Center ● Baton Rouge, LA | Pac-12/SWAC Legacy Series | Oregon 83–46 | 3−0 |
| Dec. 1 | No. 16 Utah | Mississippi Valley State | Harrison HPER Complex ● Itta Bena, MS | Pac-12/SWAC Legacy Series | Utah 109–42 | 4−0 |
| Dec. 14 | Texas Southern | No. 20 Arizona | McKale Center ● Tucson, AZ | Pac-12/SWAC Legacy Series | Arizona 89–55 | 5–0 |
| Dec. 18 | Florida A&M | California | Haas Pavilion ● Berkeley, CA | Pac-12/SWAC Legacy Series | California 88–58 | 6–0 |

Team rankings are reflective of AP poll when the game was played, not current or final ranking

† denotes game was played on neutral site

=== Conference schedule ===
This table summarizes the head-to-head results between teams in conference play.

| | Arizona | Arizona State | California | Colorado | Oregon | Oregon State | Stanford | UCLA | USC | Utah | Washington | Washington State |
|---|---|---|---|---|---|---|---|---|---|---|---|---|
| vs. Arizona | – | 0–2 | 0–2 | 1–1 | 1–1 | 1–1 | 2–0 | 0–1 | 0–1 | 1–1 | 0–1 | 1–0 |
| vs. Arizona State | 2–0 | – | 2–0 | 2–0 | 2–0 | 1–1 | 2–0 | 1–0 | 1–0 | 2–0 | 1–0 | 1–0 |
| vs. California | 2–0 | 0–2 | – | 2–0 | 1–0 | 0–1 | 2–0 | 2–0 | 1–1 | 2–0 | 1–0 | 1–0 |
| vs. Colorado | 1–1 | 0–2 | 0–2 | – | 0–1 | 0–1 | 2–0 | 0–1 | 1–0 | 1–1 | 0–2 | 0–2 |
| vs. Oregon | 1–1 | 0–2 | 0–1 | 1–0 | – | 1–1 | 1–0 | 2–0 | 1–1 | 1–0 | 1–1 | 2–0 |
| vs. Oregon State | 1–1 | 1–1 | 1–0 | 1–0 | 1–1 | – | 1–0 | 1–1 | 2–0 | 1–0 | 2–0 | 2–0 |
| vs. Stanford | 0–2 | 0–2 | 0–2 | 0–2 | 0–1 | 0–1 | – | 0–2 | 1–1 | 1–1 | 1–0 | 0–1 |
| vs. UCLA | 1–0 | 0–1 | 0–2 | 1–0 | 0–2 | 1–1 | 2–0 | – | 0–2 | 1–0 | 0–2 | 1–1 |
| vs. USC | 1–0 | 0–1 | 1–1 | 0–1 | 1–1 | 0–2 | 1–1 | 2–0 | – | 1–0 | 0–2 | 0–2 |
| vs. Utah | 1–1 | 0–2 | 0–2 | 1–1 | 0–1 | 0–1 | 1–1 | 0–1 | 0–1 | – | 0–2 | 0–2 |
| vs. Washington | 1–0 | 0–1 | 0–1 | 2–0 | 1–1 | 0–2 | 0–1 | 2–0 | 2–0 | 2–0 | – | 1–1 |
| vs. Washington State | 0–1 | 0–1 | 0–1 | 2–0 | 0–2 | 0–2 | 1–0 | 1–1 | 2–0 | 2–0 | 1–1 | – |
| Total | 11–7 | 1–17 | 4–14 | 13–5 | 7–11 | 4–14 | 15–3 | 11–7 | 11–7 | 15–3 | 7–1 | 9–9 |

=== Points scored ===
| Team | For | Against | Difference |
|---|---|---|---|
| Arizona | 2,172 | 1,871 | 301 |
| Arizona State | 1,759 | 1,991 | -232 |
| California | 1,697 | 2,021 | -324 |
| Colorado | 2,022 | 1,702 | 320 |
| Oregon | 2,172 | 1,857 | 315 |
| Oregon State | 1,966 | 1,898 | 68 |
| Stanford | 2,382 | 1,800 | 582 |
| UCLA | 2,104 | 1,846 | 258 |
| USC | 1,886 | 1,589 | 297 |
| Utah | 2,363 | 1,846 | 517 |
| Washington | 1,736 | 1,680 | 56 |
| Washington State | 1,963 | 1,793 | 170 |

Through February 27, 2023

=== Rankings ===
| | Improvement in ranking |
| | Drop in ranking |
| RV | Received votes but were not ranked in Top 25 |
| NV | No votes received |

| Team | Poll | Pre | Wk 2 | Wk 3 | Wk 4 | Wk 5 | Wk 6 | Wk 7 | Wk 8 | Wk 9 | Wk 10 | Wk 11 | Wk 12 | Wk 13 | Wk 14 | Wk 15 | Wk 16 | Wk 17 | Wk 18 | Wk 19 | Final |
|---|---|---|---|---|---|---|---|---|---|---|---|---|---|---|---|---|---|---|---|---|---|
| Arizona | AP | 19 | 18 | 15 | 14 | 12 | 20 | 18 | 18 | 15 | 14 | 19 | 19 | 22 | 17 | 18 | 14 | 21 | | | |
| Arizona | C | 19 | 18 | 14 | 13 | 12 | 17 | 16 | 15 | 13 | 10 | 15 | 14 | 20 | 15 | 18 | 14 | 20 | | | |
| Arizona State | AP | NV | NV | NV | NV | NV | NV | NV | NV | NV | NV | NV | NV | NV | NV | NV | NV | NV | | | |
| Arizona State | C | NV | NV | NV | NV | NV | NV | NV | RV | NV | NV | NV | NV | NV | NV | NV | NV | NV | | | |
| California | AP | NV | NV | NV | NV | NV | NV | NV | NV | NV | NV | NV | NV | NV | NV | NV | NV | NV | | | |
| California | C | NV | NV | NV | NV | NV | NV | NV | NV | NV | NV | NV | NV | NV | NV | NV | NV | NV | | | |
| Colorado | AP | NV | NV | NV | NV | NV | NV | NV | NV | NV | RV | 24 | 25 | RV | 25 | 21 | 21 | 20 | | | |
| Colorado | C | NV | NV | NV | NV | NV | NV | NV | NV | NV | RV | RV | RV | RV | 25 | 21 | 22 | 21 | | | |
| Oregon | AP | 20 | 21 | 18 | 19 | 17 | 16 | 16 | 17 | 18 | 21 | 23 | RV | RV | NV | NV | NV | NV | | | |
| Oregon | C | 20 | 19 | 18 | 19 | 17 | 15 | 15 | 16 | 17 | 18 | 21 | 23 | RV | RV | RV | RV | RV | | | |
| Oregon State | AP | NV | NV | NV | NV | NV | NV | NV | NV | NV | NV | NV | NV | NV | NV | NV | NV | NV | | | |
| Oregon State | C | NV | RV | RV | NV | RV | NV | NV | RV | NV | NV | NV | NV | NV | NV | NV | NV | NV | | | |
| Stanford | AP | 2 | 2 | 2 | 2 | 2 | 2 | 2 | 2 | 2 | 2 | 4 | 3 | 2 | 6 | 3 | 3 | 6 | | | |
| Stanford | C | 2 (1) | 2 | 2 | 2 | 2 | 2 | 2 | 2 | 2 | 2 | 3 | 2 | 2 | 5 | 3 | 3 | 5 | | | |
| UCLA | AP | RV | RV | 20 | 15 | 13 | 10 | 11 | 10 | 12 | 8 | 9 | 9 | 14 | 18 | 16 | 17 | 19 | | | |
| UCLA | C | RV | RV | 21 | 17 | 15 | 14 | 14 | 13 | 15 | 14 | 13 | 13 | 16 | 17 | 16 | 16 | 16 | | | |
| USC | AP | NV | NV | NV | NV | NV | NV | NV | NV | NV | NV | RV | RV | RV | RV | 25 | RV | RV | | | |
| USC | C | NV | NV | NV | NV | NV | RV | RV | RV | NV | NV | RV | RV | RV | RV | RV | RV | RV | | | |
| Utah | AP | RV | 25 | 17 | 16 | 15 | 13 | 12 | 11 | 8 | 10 | 8 | 9 | 7 | 7 | 4 | 8 | 3 | | | |
| Utah | C | RV | 24 | 19 | 16 | 14 | 13 | 12 | 11 | 8 | 8 | 9 | 9 | 7 | 7 | 5 | 7 | 4 | | | |
| Washington | AP | NV | NV | NV | NV | NV | NV | NV | NV | NV | NV | NV | NV | NV | NV | NV | NV | NV | | | |
| Washington | C | NV | NV | NV | NV | NV | NV | NV | NV | NV | NV | NV | NV | NV | NV | NV | NV | NV | | | |
| Washington State | AP | NV | RV | NV | NV | NV | NV | NV | NV | NV | NV | NV | NV | NV | NV | NV | NV | NV | | | |
| Washington State | C | RV | RV | NV | NV | NV | NV | NV | NV | NV | NV | NV | NV | NV | NV | NV | NV | NV | | | |

== Head coaches ==
=== Coaches ===
Note: Stats shown are before the beginning of the season. Pac-12 records are from time at current school.

| Team | Head coach | Previous job | Seasons at school | Record at school | Pac-12 record | Pac-12 titles | NCAA tournaments | NCAA Final Fours | NCAA Championships |
|---|---|---|---|---|---|---|---|---|---|
| Arizona | Adia Barnes | Washington (assistant) | 7th | 110–74 (.598) | 49–56 (.467) | 0 | 2 | 1 | 0 |
| Arizona State | Natasha Adair | Delaware | 1st | 0–0 (–) | 0–0 (–) | 0 | 0 | 0 | 0 |
| California | Charmin Smith | New York Liberty (assistant) | 4th | 24–47 (.338) | 6–37 (.140) | 0 | 0 | 0 | 0 |
| Colorado | JR Payne | Santa Clara | 7th | 92–83 (.526) | 38–66 (.365) | 0 | 1 | 0 | 0 |
| Oregon | Kelly Graves | Gonzaga | 9th | 191–73 (.723) | 93–49 (.655) | 3 | 5 | 1 | 0 |
| Oregon State | Scott Rueck | George Fox | 13th | 256–126 (.665) | 127–79 (.617) | 3 | 7 | 1 | 0 |
| Stanford | Tara VanDerveer | Ohio State | 37th | 1,005–208 (.829) | 548–91 (.858) | 25 | 33 | 13 | 3 |
| UCLA | Cori Close | Florida State (AHC) | 12th | 231–122 (.673) | 123–71 (.634) | 0 | 6 | 0 | 0 |
| USC | Lindsay Gottlieb | Cleveland Cavaliers (assistant) | 2nd | 12–16 (.429) | 5–12 (.294) | 0 | 8 | 0 | 0 |
| Utah | Lynne Roberts | Pacific | 8th | 112–99 (.531) | 48–76 (.387) | 0 | 1 | 0 | 0 |
| Washington | Tina Langley | Rice | 2nd | 7–16 (.304) | 2–12 (.143) | 0 | 0 | 0 | 0 |
| Washington State | Kamie Ethridge | Northern Colorado | 5th | 51–64 (.443) | 28–44 (.389) | 0 | 2 | 0 | 0 |

Notes:

- Pac-12 records, conference titles, etc. are from time at current school and are through the end the 2022–23 season.
- NCAA tournament appearances are from time at current school only.
- NCAA Final Fours and Championship include time at other schools

== Postseason ==
=== Pac-12 tournament ===
The conference tournament was played in March 2023 at the Michelob Ultra Arena in Paradise, NV. The top four teams had a bye on the first day. Teams were seeded by conference record, with ties broken by record between the tied teams followed by record against the regular-season champion, if necessary.

First round Wednesday, March 1 P12N
5 | #19 UCLA | 81*
12 | Arizona State | 70
8 | Washington | 50
9 | Oregon | 52
7 | Washington State | 61
10 | California | 49
6 | USC | 48
11 | Oregon State | 56

Quarterfinals; Thursday, March 2 P12N
4 | #21 Arizona | 59
5 | #19 UCLA | 73
1 | #6 Stanford | 76
9 | Oregon | 65
2 | #3 Utah | 58
7 | Washington State | 66
3 | #20 Colorado | 62
11 | Oregon State | 54

Semifinals; Friday, March 3 P12N
5 | #19 UCLA | 69
1 | #6 Stanford | 65
7 | Washington State | 61
3 | #20 Colorado | 49

Championship Game; Sunday, March 5 ESPN2
5 | #19 UCLA | 61
7 | Washington State | 65

Note: * denotes overtime

=== Pac-12 All-Tournament team ===
- MVP: Charlisse Leger-Walker, Washington State
- Bella Murekatete, Washington State
- Cameron Brink, Stanford
- Emily Bessoir (11 pts, 5 reb, 3 ast), UCLA
- Charisma Osborne (19 pts, 6-7 FT, 3 ast), UCLA
- Kiki Rice (13 pts, 3 reb), UCLA

=== Hall of Honor ===
The 2023 class of the Pac-12 Hall of Honor was honored on March 3 during the 2023 Women's Tournament during a ceremony prior to the tournament semifinals. The 2023 class was the first ever all-female class inducted into the Hall of Honor in recognition of the 50th anniversary of the passage of Title IX. The class includes:

- Susie Parra (Arizona Softball)
- Jackie Johnson-Powell (Arizona State Women's Track & Field)
- Dr. Luella Lilly (California Athletic Director)
- Ceal Barry (Colorado Women's Basketball Coach & Administrator)
- Janie Takeda Reed (Oregon Softball)
- Dr. Mary Budke (Oregon State Women's Golf)
- Jessica Mendoza (Stanford Softball)
- Natalie Williams (UCLA Women's Basketball & Volleyball)
- Barbara Hallquist DeGroot (USC Women's Tennis)
- Kim Gaucher (Utah Women's Basketball)
- Danielle Lawrie (Washington Softball)
- Sarah Silvernail (Washington State Women's Volleyball)

=== NCAA tournament ===
Teams from the conference that were selected to participate:

| Seed | Region | School | First round | Second round | Sweet Sixteen | Elite Eight | Final Four | Championship |
|---|---|---|---|---|---|---|---|---|
| No. 1 | Seattle Regional 4 | Stanford | No. 16 Sacred Heart 92−49 | No. 8 Ole Miss 49−53 | - | - | - | - |
| No. 2 | Greenville Regional 2 | Utah | No. 15 Gardner–Webb 103−77 | No. 10 Princeton 63−56 | No. 3 LSU 63−66 | - | - | - |
| No. 4 | Greenville Regional 1 | UCLA | No. 13 Sacramento State 67–45 | No. 5 Oklahoma 82–73 | No. 1 South Carolina 43–59 | | | |
| No. 5 | Greenville Regional 2 | Washington State | No. 12 Florida Gulf Coast 63–74 | - | - | - | - | - |
| No. 6 | Seattle Regional 4 | Colorado | No. 11 Middle Tennessee 82−60 | No. 3 Duke 61−53^{OT} | No. 2 Iowa 77−87 | - | - | - |
| No. 7 | Greensville Regional 1 | Arizona | No. 10 West Virginia 75–62 | No. 2 Maryland 64–77 | - | - | - | - |
| No. 8 | Seattle Regional 3 | USC | No. 9 South Dakota State 57−62^{OT} | - | - | - | - | - |
| | Bids 7 | W-L (%): | 5–2 (.714) | 3–2 (.600) | 0–3 (.000) | 0–0 (–) | 0–0 (–) | TOTAL: 8–7 (.533) |

=== Women's National Invitation Tournament ===
Members from the conference that were selected to participate:

| Seed | Bracket | School | First round | Second round | Third round | Quarterfinals | Semifinals | Finals |
|---|---|---|---|---|---|---|---|---|
| | | Oregon | North Dakota State 96–57 | Rice 78–53 | San Diego 81–61 | Washington 59–63 | - | - |
| | | Washington | San Francisco 61−46 | New Mexico 67−56 | Kansas State 55–48 | Oregon 63–59 | Kansas | |
| | Bid | W-L (%): | 2–0 (1.000) | 2–0 (1.000) | 2–0 (1.000) | 1–1 (.500) | 0–0 (–) | TOTAL: 7–1 (.875) |

Index to colors and formatting
Pac-12 member won
Pac-12 member lost

== Awards and honors ==
=== Players of the Week ===
Throughout the regular season, the Pac-12 offices honored two players, based on performance, by naming them player of the week and freshman of the week.

| Week | Player of the Week | School | Freshman of the Week | School | Ref. |
|---|---|---|---|---|---|
| Nov. 14 | Charlisse Leger-Walker | Washington State | Grace VanSlooten | Oregon | |
| Nov. 21 | Charisma Osborne | UCLA | Raegan Beers | Oregon State | |
| Nov. 28 | Alissa Pili | Utah | Kailyn Gilbert | Arizona | |
| Dec. 5 | Charisma Osborne (2) | UCLA | Kiki Rice | UCLA | |
| Dec. 12 | Endyia Rogers | Oregon | Christeen Iwuala | UCLA | |
| Dec. 19 | Cameron Brink | Stanford | Grace VanSlooten (2) | Oregon | |
| Dec. 26 | Grace VanSlooten | Oregon | Grace VanSlooten (3) | Oregon | |
| Jan. 2 | Rayah Marshall | USC | Raegan Beers (2) | Oregon State | |
| Jan. 9 | Cameron Brink (2) | Stanford | Raegan Beers (3) | Oregon State | |
| Jan. 16 | Destiny Littleton | USC | Chance Gray | Oregon | |
| Jan. 23 | Haley Jones | Stanford | Timea Gardiner | Oregon State | |
| Jan. 30 | Cameron Brink (3) | Stanford | Grace VanSlooten (4) | Oregon | |
| Feb. 6 | Alissa Pili (2) | Utah | Elle Ladine | Washington | |
| Feb. 13 | Jaylyn Sherrod | Colorado | Lauren Betts | Stanford | |
| Feb. 20 | Shaina Pellington | Arizona | Londynn Jones | UCLA | |
| Feb. 27 | Te-Hina Paopao | Oregon | Raegan Beers (4) | Oregon State | |

==== Totals per school ====
| School | Total |
|---|---|
| Oregon | 8 |
| UCLA | 6 |
| Oregon State | 5 |
| Stanford | 5 |
| Arizona | 2 |
| USC | 2 |
| Colorado | 1 |
| Utah | 1 |
| Washington | 1 |
| Washington State | 1 |
| Arizona State | 0 |
| California | 0 |

=== All-District ===
The United States Basketball Writers Association (USBWA) named the following from the Pac-12 to their All-District Teams:

District VIII

All-District Team

District IX

Player of the Year

All-District Team

=== Conference awards ===
The Pac-12 presents two separate sets of major awards—one voted on by conference coaches and the other by media.

==== Individual awards ====
Coaches

2023 Pac-12 women's basketball individual awards
| Award | Recipient(s) |
| Player of the Year | Alissa Pili Jr., Utah |
| Coach of the Year | Lynne Roberts, Utah |
| Defensive Player of the Year | Cameron Brink Jr., Stanford |
| Freshman of the Year | Raegan Beers, Fr., Oregon State |
| Scholar-Athlete of the Year | Hannah Jump Sr., Stanford |
| Most Improved Player of the Year | Shaina Pellington, G-Sr., Arizona & Aaronette Vonleh, So., Colorado |
| Sixth Player of the Year | Raegan Beers, Fr., Oregon State |

Media Sources:

2023 Pac-12 women's basketball individual awards
| Award | Recipient(s) |
| Player of the Year | Alissa Pili Jr., Utah |
| Coach of the Year | Lynne Roberts, Utah |
| Defensive Player of the Year | Cameron Brink Jr., Stanford |
| Freshman of the Year | Raegan Beers, Fr., Oregon State |
| Most Improved Player of the Year | Alissa Pili Jr., Utah |
| Sixth Player of the Year | Raegan Beers, Fr., Oregon State |

==== All-Pac-12 ====
First Team

| Name | School | Pos. | Yr. | Hometown (last school) |
|---|---|---|---|---|
| Raegan Beers | Oregon State | F | Fr. | Littleton, Colo. (Valor Christian) |
| Cameron Brink†† | Stanford | F | Jr. | Beaverton, Ore. (Mountainside HS) |
| Haley Jones††† | Stanford | G | Sr. | Santa Cruz, Calif. (Archbishop Mitty) |
| Hannah Jump | Stanford | G | Sr. | San Jose, Calif. (Pinewood HS) |
| Gianna Kneepkens†† | Utah | G | So. | Duluth, Minn. (Duluth Marshall HS) |
| Charlisse Leger-Walker††† | Washington State | G | Jr. | Waikato, New Zealand (St. Peter's School Cambridge) |
| Destiny Littleton | USC | G | Gr. | San Diego, Calif. (The Bishop's School) |
| Rayah Marshall | USC | G/F | So. | Los Angeles, Calif. (Lynwood HS) |
| Quay Miller | Colorado | C | Sr. | Renton, Wash. (Kentridge HS) |
| Charisma Osborne††† | UCLA | G | Sr. | Moreno Valley, Calif. (Windward School) |
| Shaina Pellington | Arizona | G | 5th | Pickering, Ontario (Dunbarton) |
| Alissa Pili††‡ | Utah | F | Jr. | Anchorage, Alaska (USC) |
| Cate Reese†††† | Arizona | F | 5th | Cypress, Texas (Cypress Woods HS) |
| Endyia Rogers††† | Oregon | G | Sr. | Dallas, Texas (Bishop Lynch HS) |
| Jaylyn Sherrod | Colorado | G | Sr. | Birmingham, Ala. (Ramsay HS) |
| Kadi Sissoko | USC | F | Gr. | Paris, France (Marcelin Berthelot) |

- ‡ Pac-12 Player of the Year
- †††† four-time All-Pac-12 First Team honoree
- ††† three-time All-Pac-12 First Team honoree
- †† two-time All-Pac-12 First Team honoree
- † two-time All-Pac-12 honoree

Honorable Mention

Jayda Curry, CAL; Dalayah Daniels; WASH; Frida Formann, COLO; Jenna Johnson, UTAH; Esmery Martinez, ARIZ; Leilani McIntosh, CAL; Kennady McQueen, UTAH; Bella Murekatete, WSU; Te-Hina Paopao, ORE; Lauren Schwartz, WASH; Tyi Skinner, ASU; Haley Van Dyke, WASH; Grace VanSlooten, ORE; Aaronette Vonleh, COLO; Talia von Oelhoffen, OSU

==== All-Freshman Team ====
| Name | School | Pos. | Hometown |
|---|---|---|---|
| Raegan Beers | Oregon State | F | Littleton, Colo. |
| Chance Gray | Oregon | G | Cincinnati, Ohio |
| Londynn Jones | UCLA | G | Riverside, Calif. |
| Kiki Rice | UCLA | G | Bethesda, Md. |
| Grace VanSlooten | Oregon | F | Toledo, Ohio |

† Pac-12 Player of the Year ‡ Pac-12 Freshman of the Year

Honorable Mention

Lauren Betts, STAN; Timea Gardiner, OSU; Elle Ladine, WASH; Talana Lepolo, STAN; Astera Tuhina, WSU

==== All-Defensive Team ====
| Name | School | Pos. | Yr. |
|---|---|---|---|
| Cameron Brink†† | Stanford | F | Jr. |
| Rayah Marshall | USC | G/F | So. |
| Shaina Pellington | Arizona | G | 5th |
| Helena Pueyo | Arizona | G | Sr. |
| Jaylyn Sherrod†† | Colorado | G | Sr. |

- † Pac-12 Player of the Year
- ‡Pac-12 Defensive Player of the Year
- †† two-time Pac-12 All-Defensive Team honoree

Honorable Mention

Okako Adika, USC; Chance Gray, ORE; Charlisse Leger-Walker, WSU; Jelena Mitrovic, OSU; Jayda Noble, WASH; Charisma Osborne, UCLA; Jaddan Simmons, ASU; Kayla Williams, USC

==== Scholar Athlete of the Year ====
The Pac-12 moved to seasonal academic honor rolls, discontinuing sport-by-sport teams, starting in 2019–20

| Name | School | Pos. | Ht. | GPA | Major |
|---|---|---|---|---|---|
| Hannah Jump | Stanford | G | 6−0 | 3.75 | Psychology |

== 2022–23 season statistic leaders ==
Scoring leaders
| Rk | Player | PTS | PPG |
|---|---|---|---|
| 1 | Alissa Pili | 557 | 20.6 |
| 2 | Charlisse Leger-Walker | 513 | 19.0 |
| 3 | Tyi Skinner | 449 | 18.0 |
| 4 | Charisma Osborne | 467 | 16.1 |
| 5 | Talia Von oelhoffen | 375 | 15.6 |

Rebound leaders
| Rk | Player | REB | RPG |
|---|---|---|---|
| 1 | Rayah Marshall | 298 | 11.5 |
| 2 | Phillipina Kyei | 320 | 11.0 |
| 3 | Cameron Brink | 291 | 9.4 |
| 4 | Haley Jones | 277 | 8.9 |
| 5 | Quay Miller | 253 | 8.7 |

Field goal leaders (avg 5 fga/gm)
| Rk | Player | FG | FGA | PCT |
|---|---|---|---|---|
| 1 | Alissa Pili | 223 | 372 | 59.9% |
| 2 | Raegan Beers | 137 | 237 | 57.8% |
| 3 | Aaronette Vonleh | 153 | 265 | 57.7% |
| 4 | Shaina Pellington | 142 | 262 | 54.2% |
| 5 | Phillipina Kyei | 90 | 166 | 54.2% |

Assist leaders
| Rk | Player | AST | APG |
|---|---|---|---|
| 1 | Jaylyn Sherrod | 139 | 5.0 |
| 2 | Charlisse Leger-Walker | 111 | 4.4 |
| 3 | Haley Jones | 124 | 4.0 |
| 4 | Endyia Rogers | 113 | 3.9 |
| 5 | Shaina Pellington | 100 | 3.7 |

Block leaders
| Rk | Player | BLK | BPG |
|---|---|---|---|
| 1 | Cameron Brink | 109 | 3.5 |
| 2 | Rayah Marshall | 89 | 3.4 |
| 3 | Jelena Mitrovic | 42 | 1.5 |
| 4 | Tara Wallack | 39 | 1.3 |
| 5 | Phillipina Kyei | 38 | 1.3 |

Free throw leaders
| Rk | Player | FT | FTA | PCT |
|---|---|---|---|---|
| 1 | Londynn Jones | 60 | 68 | 88.2% |
| 2 | Isabel Palmer | 56 | 64 | 87.5% |
| 3 | Destiny Littleton | 118 | 135 | 87.4% |
| 4 | Charlisse Leger-Walker | 77 | 91 | 84.2% |
| 5 | Talia Von Oelhoffen | 64 | 76 | 83.0% |

Steal leaders
| Rk | Player | STL | SPG |
|---|---|---|---|
| 1 | Jaylyn Sherrod | 66 | 2.4 |
| 2 | Helena Pueyo | 67 | 2.3 |
| 3 | Shaina Pellington | 51 | 1.9 |
| 4 | Jaddan Simmons | 49 | 1.9 |
| 5 | Jayda Noble | 47 | 1.8 |

Three point leaders
| Rk | Player | 3P | 3PA | % |
|---|---|---|---|---|
| 1 | Adlee Blacklock | 28 | 60 | 46.7% |
| 2 | Alissa Pili | 27 | 59 | 45.8% |
| 3 | Hannah Jump | 92 | 207 | 44.4% |
| 4 | Alyson Miura | 21 | 48 | 43.8% |
| 5 | Okako Adika | 41 | 97 | 42.3% |

== 2023 WNBA draft ==
| Round | Pick | Player | Position | Nationality | Team | School/club team |
|---|---|---|---|---|---|---|
| − | − | | | | − | |

== Home game attendance ==
| Team | Stadium | Capacity | Game 1 | Game 2 | Game 3 | Game 4 | Game 5 | Game 6 | Game 7 | Game 8 | Game 9 | Game 10 | Game 11 | Game 12 | Game 13 | Game 14 | Game 15 | Game 16 | Game 17 | Game 18 | Total | Average | % of capacity |
|---|---|---|---|---|---|---|---|---|---|---|---|---|---|---|---|---|---|---|---|---|---|---|---|
| Arizona | McKale Center | 14,644 | 6,809 | 6,653 | 7,206 | 6,898 | 7,381 | 6,577 | 9,495 | 7,182 | 7,963 | 7,884 | 7,494 | 9,868† | 7,268 | 8,238 | 8,267 | | | | 115,183 | 7,199 | 50.62% |
| Arizona State | Desert Financial Arena | 14,100 | 6,304† | 2,565 | 1,762 | 3,221 | 1,577 | 1,876 | 1,486 | 3,508 | 2,349 | 1,851 | 2,185 | 1,759 | 2,793 | 2,393 | | | | | 35,629 | 2,545 | 18.04% |
| California | Haas Pavilion | 11,858 | 724 | 1,023 | 894 | 894 | 678 | 655 | 671 | 605 | 842 | 3,442† | 2,394 | 1,332 | 1,005 | 1,017 | 1,606 | 1,932 | | | 19,714 | 1,232 | 10.39% |
| Colorado | Coors Events Center | 11,064 | 479 | 1,115 | 1,248 | 511 | 573 | 546 | 1,575 | 1,974 | 2,227 | 2,377 | 2,055 | 2,148 | 2,963 | 3,452† | | | | | 23,243 | 1,660 | 15.00% |
| Oregon | Matthew Knight Arena | 12,364 | 5,661 | 6,175 | 6,128 | 5,892 | 6,990† | 5,584 | 5,827 | 6,726 | 6,031 | 6,497 | 6,900 | 5,919 | 6,289 | 6,173 | 6,757 | | | | 93,549 | 6,237 | 50.44% |
| Oregon State | Gill Coliseum | 9,604 | 3,663 | 3,512 | 3,310 | 3,339 | **9,604**† | 3,429 | 3,477 | 3,769 | 3,546 | 4,039 | 4,122 | 5,975 | 4,557 | 4,338 | 3,711 | 4,357 | | | 68,748 | 4,297 | 44.73% |
| Stanford | Maples Pavilion | 7,233 | 3,012 | 2,421 | 2,469 | **7,287**† | 2,603 | 3,731 | 4,480 | 2,988 | 3,970 | 2,810 | 3,824 | 3,442 | 3,730 | 4,122 | 3,890 | 5,133 | 6,343 | 5,813 | 72,068 | 4,004 | 55.35% |
| UCLA | Pauley Pavilion | 13,800 | 0 | 3,918 | 2,248 | 2,455 | 2,480 | 2,473 | 2,163 | 0 | 6,855† | 4,317 | 3,482 | 3,462 | 2,935 | 3,629 | 2,825 | 4,375 | | | 47,617 | 2,976 | 21.56% |
| USC | Galen Center | 10,258 | 818 | 561 | 689 | 316 | 228 | 258 | 259 | 3,109† | 304 | 1,031 | 2,418 | 801 | 1,356 | 1,126 | 674 | 842 | 2,832 | | 17,622 | 1,037 | 10.10% |
| Utah | Jon M. Huntsman Center | 15,000 | 1,058 | 1,483 | 1,386 | 2,521 | 1,894 | 2,162 | 2,109 | 2,915 | 3,251 | 3,211 | 3,725 | 3,268 | 3,755 | 9,611† | | | | | 42,349 | 3,025 | 20.16% |
| Washington | Alaska Airlines Arena | 10,000 | 1,513 | 1,943 | 1,362 | 3,859 | 1,686 | 1,660 | 2,753 | 1,493 | 1,291 | 2,318 | 2,286 | 2,265 | 2,543 | 3,496 | 4,317† | 2,192 | 3,475 | | 40,452 | 2,380 | 23.80% |
| Washington State | Beasley Coliseum | 11,671 | 321 | 730 | 630 | 792 | 553 | 887 | 680 | 1,057 | 956 | 986 | 1,128 | 1,345 | 1,061 | 1,500 | | | | | 12,626 | 902 | 7.72% |
| Total | | 11,835 | | | | | | | | | | | | | | | | | | | 555,159 | 3,017 | 25.49% |

Bold – At or exceed capacity
†Season high

== See also ==
- 2022–23 Pac-12 Conference men's basketball season
