= Pac-12 Conference Women's Basketball Coach of the Year =

- Awarded for: the top women's basketball coach in the Pac-12 Conference
- Country: United States

History
- First award: 1987
- First winner: Chris Gobrecht, Washington
- Most recent: Tara VanDerveer, Stanford

The Pac-12 Conference Women's Basketball Coach of the Year is an annual college basketball award presented to the top women's basketball coach in the Pac-12 Conference. The winner is selected by conference coaches. The award was first given following the 1986–87 season to Chris Gobrecht of Washington. Tara VanDerveer has won the award a record eighteen times.

== Key ==
	Awarded one of the following National Coach of the Year awards that year: Associated Press Coach of the Year (AP) Naismith Coach of the Year (N) USBWA Women's National Coach of the Year (USBWA) WBCA National Coach of the Year Award (WBCA)
Coach (X)	Denotes the number of times the coach had been awarded the Coach of the Year award at that point
†	Co-Coaches of the Year
*	Elected to the Naismith Memorial Basketball Hall of Fame as a coach but is no longer active
*^	Active coach who has been elected to the Naismith Memorial Basketball Hall of Fame (as a coach)
Conf. W–L	Conference win–loss record for that season
Conf. St.^{T}	Conference standing at year's end (^{T}denotes a tie)
Overall W–L	Overall win–loss record for that season
Season^{‡}	Team won the NCAA Division I National Championship

== Winners ==
Season	Coach	School	National Coach of the Year Awards	Conf. W–L	Conf. St.	Overall W–L	Source(s)
1986–87	Chris Gobrecht	Washington	—	14–4	2nd	23–7	
1987–88^{†}	Chris Gobrecht (2)	Washington	—	16–2	1st	25–5	
1987–88^{†}	Linda Sharp	USC	—	15–3	2nd	22–8	
1988–89	Tara VanDerveer*	Stanford	WBCA	18–0	1st	28–3	
1989–90^{‡}	Tara VanDerveer* (2)	Stanford	N USBWA	17–1	1st^{T}	32–3	
1990–91	Harold Rhodes	Washington State	—	10–8	—	18–11	
1991–92	Gooch Foster	California	—	12–6	3rd^{T}	20–9	
1992–93	Marianne Stanley*	USC	—	14–4	2nd	22–7	
1993–94	Jody Runge	Oregon	—	13–5	3rd	20–9	
1994–95	Tara VanDerveer* (3)	Stanford	—	17–1	1st	30–3	
1995–96^{†}	Marianne Stanley* (2)	Stanford	—	18–0	1st	29–3	
1995–96^{†}	Amy Tucker	Stanford	—	18–0	1st	29–3	
1996–97	Tara VanDerveer* (4)	Stanford	—	18–0	1st	34–2	
1997–98	Joan Bonvicini	Arizona	—	14–4	2nd^{T}	23–7	
1998–99	Jody Runge (2)	Oregon	—	15–3	1st^{T}	25–6	
1999–2000	Judy Spoelstra	Oregon State	—	–	—	–	
2000–01	Charli Turner Thorne	Arizona State	—	–	—	–	
2001–02	Tara VanDerveer* (5)	Stanford	—	–	—	–	
2002–03	Tara VanDerveer* (6)	Stanford	—	–	—	–	
2003–04	Caren Horstmeyer	California	—	4–14	9th	12–17	
2004–05	Tara VanDerveer* (7)	Stanford	—	–	—	–	
2005–06	Tara VanDerveer* (8)	Stanford	—	–	—	–	
2006–07	Joanne Boyle	California	—	12–6	3rd	23–9	
2007–08	Tara VanDerveer* (9)	Stanford	—	–	—	–	
2008–09	Tara VanDerveer* (10)	Stanford	—	–	—	–	
2009–10	Nikki Fargas	UCLA	—	15–3	2nd	25–9	
2010–11	Tara VanDerveer* (11)	Stanford	AP; N WBCA	–	—	–	
2011–12	Tara VanDerveer* (12)	Stanford	—	–	—	–	
2012–13	Tara VanDerveer* (13)	Stanford	—	–	—	–	
2013–14	Tara VanDerveer* (14)	Stanford	—	–	—	–	
2014–15	Scott Rueck	Oregon State	—	–	—	–	
2015–16	Charli Turner Thorne (2)	Arizona State	—	–	—	–	
2016–17	Scott Rueck (2)	Oregon State	—	–	—	–	
2017–18	Tara VanDerveer* (15)	Stanford	—	–	—	–	
2018–19	Kelly Graves	Oregon	—	16–2	1st	33–5	
2019–20	Kelly Graves (2)	Oregon	—	17–1	1st	31–2	
2020–21^{‡}	Tara VanDerveer* (16)	Stanford	N USBWA	19–2	1st	31–2	
2021–22	Tara VanDerveer* (17)	Stanford	—	16–0	1st	32–4	
2022–23	Lynne Roberts	Utah	—	15–3	1st^{T}	27–5	
2023–24	Tara VanDerveer* (18)	Stanford	—	13–3	1st	30–6	
2024–25	Pac-12 basketball on hiatus due to conference realignment						
2025–26	Pac-12 basketball on hiatus due to conference realignment						
2026–27							

== Winners by school ==
School (year joined)	Winners	Years
Stanford	19	1989, 1990, 1995, 1996, 1997, 2002, 2003, 2005, 2006, 2008, 2009, 2011, 2012, 2013, 2014, 2018, 2021, 2022, 2024
Oregon	4	1994, 1999, 2019, 2020
California	3	1992, 2004, 2007
Oregon State	3	2000, 2015, 2017
Arizona State	2	2001, 2016
USC	2	1988, 1993
Washington	2	1987, 1988
Arizona	1	1998
UCLA	1	2010
Utah (2011)	1	2023
Washington State	1	1991
Colorado (2011)	0	—

== See also ==
- Pac-12 Conference Men's Basketball Coach of the Year
