= Cameron Brink =

American basketball player (born 2001)

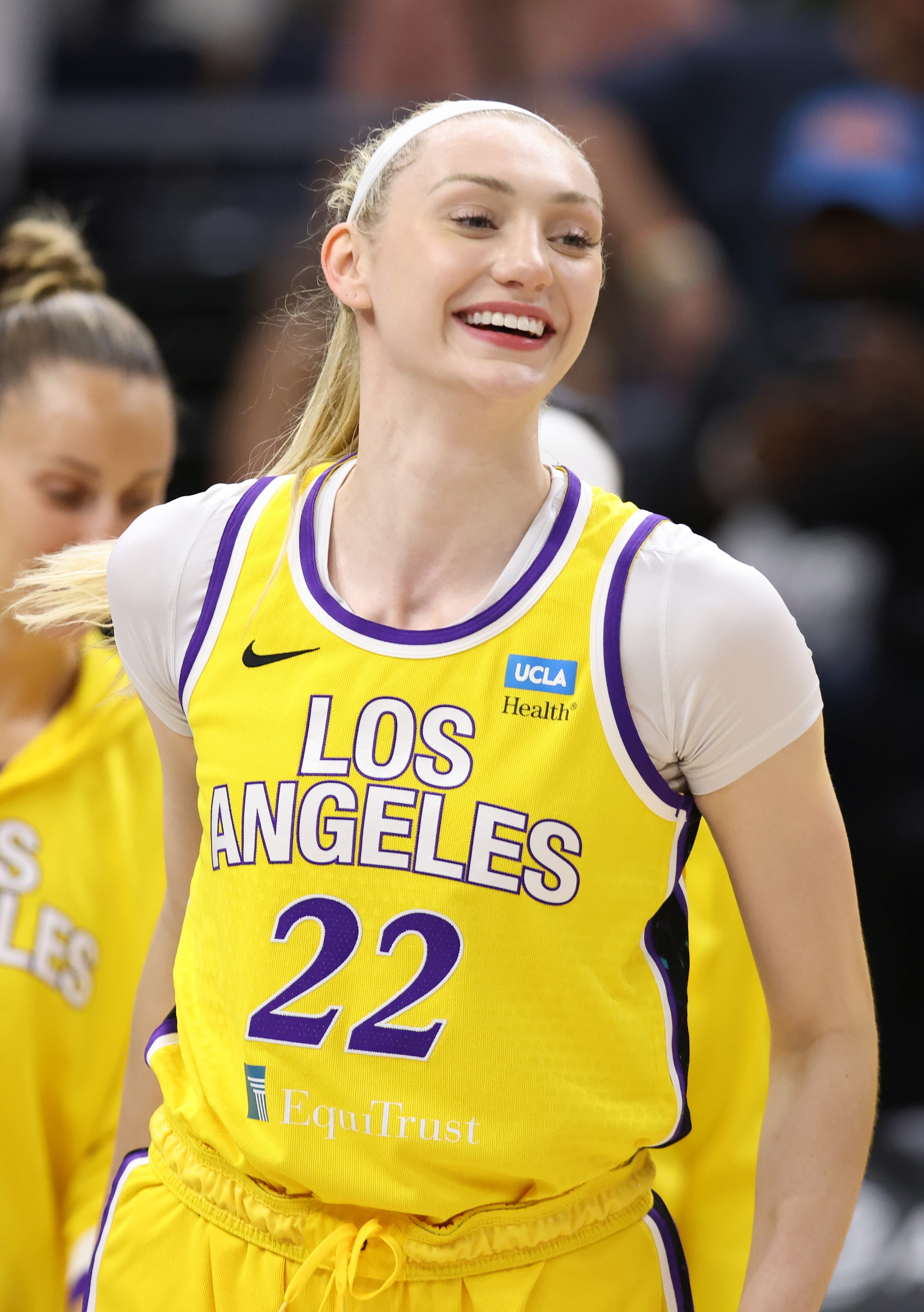
- Brink with the Los Angeles Sparks in 2024

No. 22 – Los Angeles Sparks
- Position: Power forward / center
- League: WNBA

Personal information
- Born: December 31, 2001 (age 24) Princeton, New Jersey, U.S.
- Listed height: 6 ft 4 in (1.93 m)
- Listed weight: 170 lb (77 kg)

Career information
- High school: Southridge (Beaverton, Oregon); Mountainside (Beaverton, Oregon)
- College: Stanford (2020–2024)
- WNBA draft: 2024: 1st round, 2nd overall pick
- Drafted by: Los Angeles Sparks
- Playing career: 2024–present

Career history
- 2024–present: Los Angeles Sparks
- 2025: Lunar Owls
- 2026: Breeze
- 2027–present: Hive

Career highlights
- NCAA champion (2021); Unanimous first-team All-American (2024); Second-team All-American – AP, USBWA (2023); Third-team All-American – AP, USBWA (2022); 3× WBCA Coaches' All-American (2022–2024); Lisa Leslie Award (2024); Naismith Defensive Player of the Year (2024); WBCA Defensive Player of the Year (2023); 2× Pac-12 Player of the Year (2022, 2024); 3× Pac-12 Defensive Player of the Year (2022–2024); 3× All-Pac-12 (2022–2024); 3× Pac-12 All-Defensive Team (2022–2024); Pac-12 All-Freshman Team (2021); McDonald's All-American (2020); FIBA 3x3 World Cup MVP (2023)
- Stats at Basketball Reference
Medals
Representing the United States
Women's basketball
FIBA Under-19 World Cup
Gold medal – first place	2019 Thailand	Team
FIBA Under-17 World Cup
Gold medal – first place	2018 Belarus	Team
Women's 3x3 basketball
FIBA 3x3 World Cup
Gold medal – first place	2023 Austria	Team

Cameron Brink (born December 31, 2001) is an American professional basketball player for the Los Angeles Sparks of the Women's National Basketball Association (WNBA) and for the Hive of Unrivaled. She played college basketball at Stanford. She attended Mountainside High School and Southridge High School, both in her hometown of Beaverton, Oregon, where she was a McDonald's All-American and was ranked the third-best player in her class by ESPN.

As a freshman at Stanford, Brink helped her team win the 2021 NCAA Division I tournament. In her sophomore season, she shared Pac-12 Player of the Year honors and led her team to the Final Four. As a junior, Brink received the WBCA Defensive Player of the Year award and became Stanford's all-time leader in blocks. In her senior season, she was again named Pac-12 Player of the Year. Brink has won two gold medals with the United States at the youth international level and led the national 3x3 team to the 2023 FIBA 3x3 World Cup title, where she was named the tournament's most valuable player (MVP).

== Early life ==
Cameron Lee Brink was born on December 31, 2001, in Princeton, New Jersey. She lived in Amsterdam for three years, from age eight, because of her parents' jobs at Nike and returned to the United States before starting sixth grade.

Brink was not initially interested in basketball, preferring art as a child and being drawn to volleyball after watching the 2012 Summer Olympics. She began playing basketball after attending a camp held by her godfather, Dell Curry, while her family was visiting Curry's family in Charlotte, North Carolina. Upon returning to Amsterdam, Brink played for her school and was the youngest player on the team. One year later, her family moved to Oregon, where she joined a basketball club.

== High school ==
Brink played basketball for Southridge High School in Beaverton, Oregon for three seasons under head coach Mike Bergmann. As a freshman, she averaged 12.5 points, 8.5 rebounds and 3.7 blocks per game, helping her team win the Class 6A state title. In her sophomore season, Brink led Southridge to a 28–1 record and a second straight Class 6A state championship, averaging 17.1 points, 10.5 rebounds and 2.7 blocks per game. Her team won all 26 games against in-state opponents by double digits. She was named Oregon Gatorade Player of the Year.

Entering her junior season, Brink entered a leading role for Southridge, averaging 21.3 points and 11.1 rebounds per game. She led her team to the 6A state final and received USA Today Oregon Player of the Year honors, while repeating as Oregon Gatorade Player of the Year. For her senior season, Brink transferred to Mountainside High School in Beaverton. She averaged 19.7 points, 13.2 rebounds, 3.1 assists, 2.5 steals and 2.5 blocks per game as a senior. She missed five games with a high ankle sprain and played through injury at the state tournament. Brink was selected to play in the McDonald's All-American Game and the Jordan Brand Classic, which were both canceled due to the COVID-19 pandemic.

In addition to basketball, Brink played volleyball for Southridge as a middle blocker. She helped the team win its first state championship as a sophomore, recording nine kills and five blocks against Central Catholic High School in the Class 6A final.

Brink was considered a five-star recruit and the number three player in the 2020 class by ESPN. On November 7, 2018, she committed to Stanford over scholarship offers from Oregon and UConn. Brink described Stanford as her dream school and was drawn there by her relationships with head coach Tara VanDerveer and assistant coach Kate Paye. She also felt that attending the university would benefit her after her playing career due to its academic prowess. Brink had received an offer from Stanford after a camp at age 13, where she impressed then-assistant coach Amy Tucker during a exhibition game against a college team.

== College career ==
=== Freshman season ===
On November 25, 2020, Brink made her college debut, recording 17 points and 9 rebounds in a 108–40 win over Cal Poly. On March 5, 2021, she posted a season-high 24 points while also having 11 rebounds and five blocks in a 79–45 victory against Oregon State at the Pac-12 tournament semifinals. Brink was named to the all-tournament team after Stanford won the Pac-12 tournament. Brink helped her team win its first national championship since 1992, contributing 10 points, six rebounds and three blocks in a 54–53 win over Arizona in the title game. As a freshman, Brink averaged 9.9 points, 6.6 rebounds and 2.8 blocks per game, and was selected to the Pac-12 All-Freshman Team and All-Pac-12 Honorable Mention. She set a program single-season record with 88 blocks.

=== Sophomore season ===
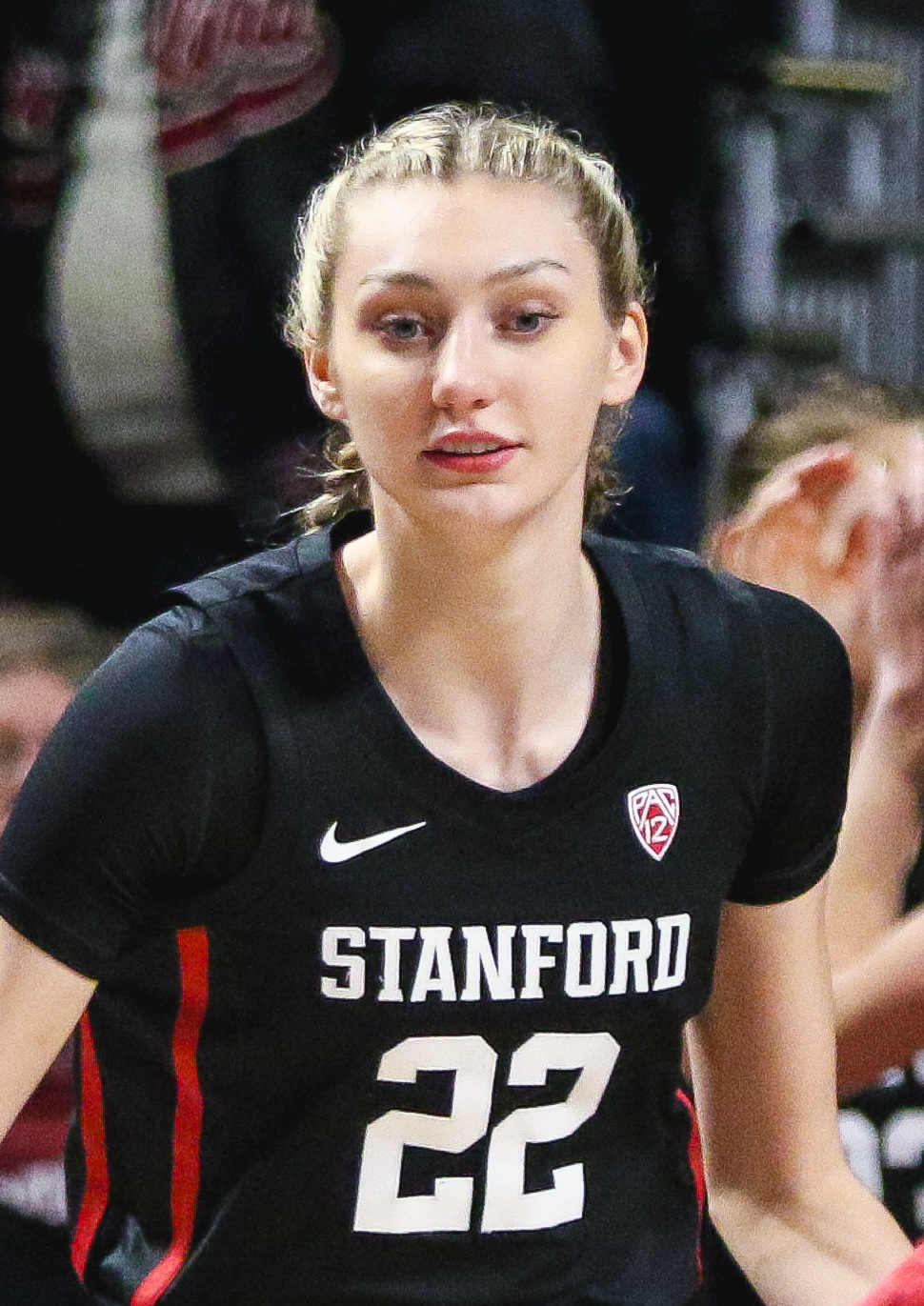
Brink in 2021

In her sophomore season, Brink assumed a leading role for Stanford with Haley Jones. On November 25, 2021, she recorded 21 points, 22 rebounds and five blocks in a 69–66 win over fourth-ranked Indiana. On January 30, 2022, Brink had 25 points and 15 rebounds in a 75–69 victory over eighth-ranked Arizona. On February 6, she posted a season-high 26 points and grabbed 14 rebounds in an 83–57 win against USC. Brink helped Stanford win the Pac-12 tournament, where she was named to the all-tournament team. In the Elite Eight of the 2022 NCAA tournament, she posted 10 points, six rebounds and six blocks in a 59–50 win over Texas, leading her team back to the Final Four. As a sophomore, Brink averaged 13.5 points, 8.1 rebounds and 2.6 blocks per game, setting a new program single-season record with 91 blocks. She led Stanford with 13 double-doubles. She earned Pac-12 Player of the Year from the media, Pac-12 Defensive Player of the Year, All-Pac-12 Team and All-Defensive Team honors. Brink was named a third-team All-American by the Associated Press (AP) and United States Basketball Writers Association (USBWA), and made the Women's Basketball Coaches Association (WBCA) All-America team.

=== Junior season ===
On January 29, 2023, Brink recorded her first triple-double, with 16 points, 11 rebounds and a career-high 10 blocks in a 62–54 win over Oregon. She surpassed Jayne Appel as Stanford's all-time leader in blocks on February 17, after posting 12 points, 10 rebounds and six blocks in a 50–47 victory over USC. As a junior, Brink averaged 15.1 points, 9.6 rebounds and 3.5 blocks per game, and was named All-Pac-12 and Pac-12 Defensive Player of the Year. She received the WBCA Defensive Player of the Year award as the top defensive player in the nation. Brink earned second-team All-American honors from the AP and the USBWA, while repeating as a WBCA All-American. She ranked third among Division I players in blocks per game and broke her own single-season program record with 118 blocks.

=== Senior season ===
On November 19, 2023, Brink recorded a career-high 29 points, 11 rebounds and six blocks in an 82–79 overtime win over Duke. On February 29, 2024, she posted 25 points and a career-high 24 rebounds in a 67–63 victory over Oregon State. Brink was selected as Pac-12 Player of the Year and Defensive Player of the Year by the league's coaches and media. She made her third All-Pac-12 and conference All-Defensive teams. On March 12, Brink declared for the 2024 WNBA draft.

== Professional career ==
=== WNBA ===
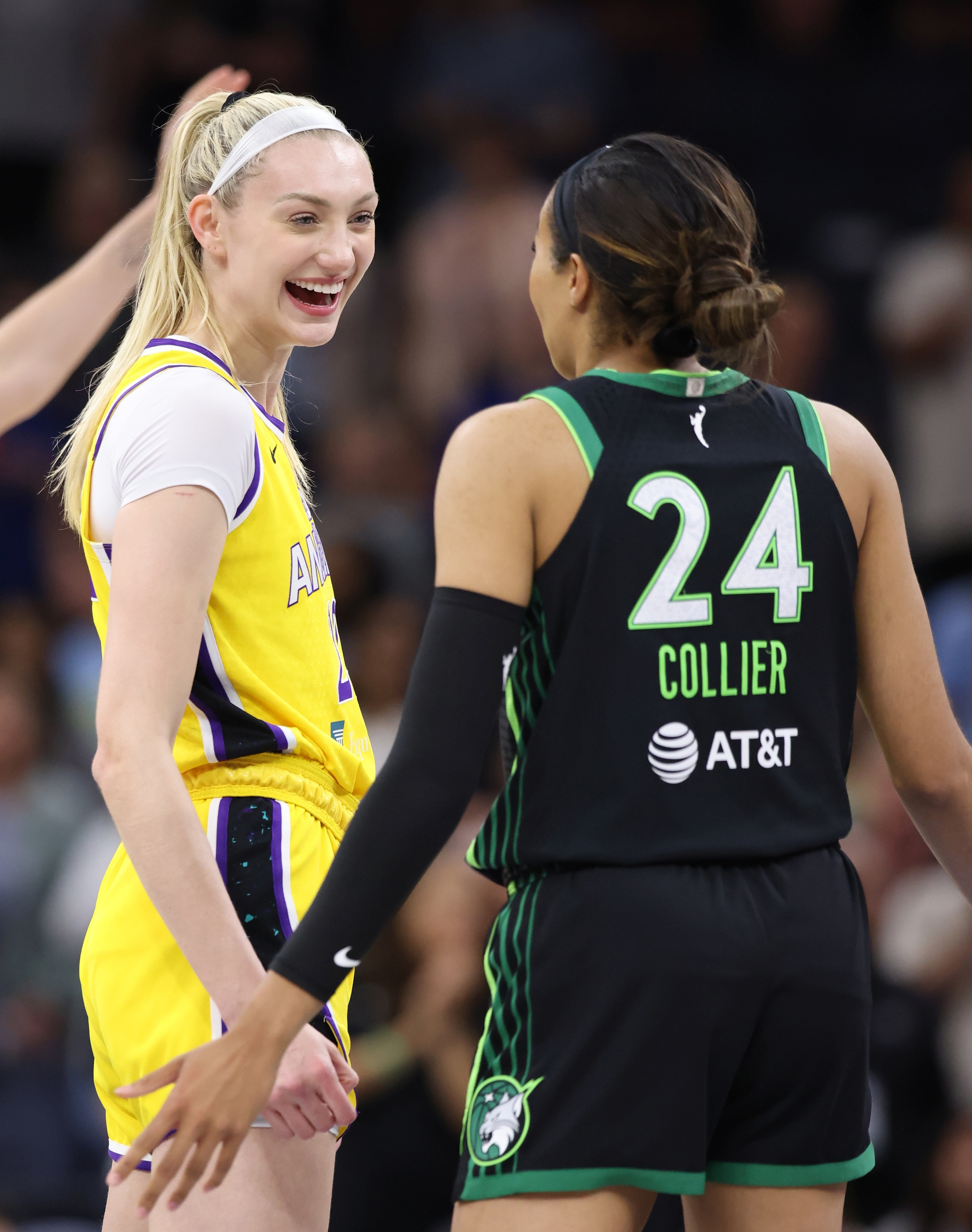
Brink (left) and Napheesa Collier in 2024

Brink was selected as the second pick of the 2024 WNBA draft by the Los Angeles Sparks. She made her WNBA professional debut on May 4, 2024 in the Sparks' first pre-season game. The game was held at Rogers Place in Edmonton, Alberta, as the league's annual Canada Game. Brink went on to start for the Sparks in the 84–79 win against the Seattle Storm. In her first official game, she accrued 11 points, three rebounds and two blocks in 20 minutes. On June 18, 2024, Brink exited the Sparks' 79–70 loss against the Connecticut Sun in the first quarter after suffering an apparent leg injury. The next day, it was announced that she had suffered a torn ACL, prematurely ending her season.

On July 29, 2025, Brink returned from her injury for a home game against the Las Vegas Aces, playing 14 minutes and securing 5 points, 3 rebounds and 1 assist. Brink played 19 games during the 2025 season, averaging 12.8 minutes, 5.1 points and 4.3 rebounds per game. In a mid-season interview, Brink said of her injury: "I'm still figuring it out. I think I've gotten through the hard part, but it's really hard, the acclimating. Everything is so fast. And you are just always a little scared in your mind. I don't feel as athletic, but I know I'll get there. I have moments when I feel great, and sometimes I feel like I'm floating on offense, a little unsure about what I'm doing, but my coaching staff has been amazing."

=== Unrivaled ===
On December 17, 2024, Brink signed a multiyear deal with the Lunar Owls for the inaugural 2025 season of Unrivaled, the women’s 3-on-3 basketball league founded by Napheesa Collier and Breanna Stewart. However, Brink did not play during the 2025 season due to her knee injury.

On November 5, 2025, it was announced that Brink had been drafted by Breeze for the 2026 Unrivaled season. She joined Hive for the 2027 season.

== National team career ==
Brink represented the United States at the 2018 FIBA Under-17 World Cup in Belarus. She averaged 3.6 points and 4.6 rebounds per game, as her team won the gold medal. Brink helped the United States win another gold medal at the 2019 FIBA Under-19 World Cup in Thailand, averaging 2.0 points and 3.4 rebounds per game.

Brink played for the United States national 3x3 team at the 2023 FIBA 3x3 World Cup in Austria. She helped her team win the gold medal and was named tournament MVP after leading the competition with 39 rebounds and 10 blocks. Brink was initially named to the United States 3x3 team for the 2024 Summer Olympics. However, after her ACL injury sidelined her indefinitely, she had to be replaced on the team by Dearica Hamby.

== Career statistics ==
Legend
GP	Games played	GS	Games started	MPG	Minutes per game	FG%	Field goal percentage
3P%	3-point field goal percentage	FT%	Free throw percentage	RPG	Rebounds per game	APG	Assists per game
SPG	Steals per game	BPG	Blocks per game	TO	Turnovers per game	PPG	Points per game
**Bold**	Career high	*	Led Division I	°	Led the league	‡	WNBA record

=== WNBA ===
==== Regular season ====
WNBA regular season statistics
Year	Team	GP	GS	MPG	FG%	3P%	FT%	RPG	APG	SPG	BPG	TO	PPG
2024	Los Angeles	15	**15**	**21.9**	.398	**.323**	**.840**	**5.3**	**1.7**	**1.1**	**2.3**	2.3	7.5
2025	Los Angeles	19	0	12.8	.427	.294	.762	4.3	.5	.5	1.4	**1.3**	5.1
2026	Los Angeles	**31**	1	19.2	**.464**	.315	.771	5.0	1.5	.6	1.8	2.4	**9.5**
**Career**	3 years, 1 team	65	16	18.0	.440	.312	.783	4.9	1.2	.7	1.8	2.1	7.8

=== College ===
NCAA statistics
Year	Team	GP	GS	MPG	FG%	3P%	FT%	RPG	APG	SPG	BPG	TO	PPG
2020–21	Stanford	32	20	18.3	**.581**	**.367**	.647	6.6	.9	.5	2.8	**1.3**	9.9
2021–22	Stanford	**35**	**34**	21.9	.556	.355	.615	8.1	1.2	**.9**	2.6	1.6	13.5
2022–23	Stanford	34	**34**	24.8	.486	.213	**.848**	9.6	1.8	.5	3.5	2.6	15.1
2023–24	Stanford	34	**34**	**25.5**	.511	.304	.836	**11.9**	**2.8**	.8	**3.7***	2.8	**17.4**
**Career**		135	122	22.5	.527	.299	.760	9.1	1.7	.7	3.1	1.9	14.0

== Business interests ==
Brink was estimated to be one of the highest-earning women's college basketball players from name, image and likeness (NIL) deals. In 2023, she signed an NIL deal with Chegg as part of a campaign to support student mental health, inspired by her own struggles with anxiety. Later that year, Brink became the first female basketball player to sign with New Balance. She has also signed deals with Urban Outfitters and Netflix.

In 2025, she started a podcast, Straight to Cam, with her co-host, Sydel Curry, the sister of Stephen Curry and Seth Curry.

== Personal life ==
Brink is the daughter of Greg Brink and Michelle Bain-Brink. Her family is close with the family of National Basketball Association (NBA) player Stephen Curry, whose mother, Sonya, is Brink's godmother. Her mother was roommates with Sonya at Virginia Tech, where her father played on the basketball team. Brink has an older brother, Cy.

Brink began dating Ben Felter on March 10, 2021, after meeting at Stanford University where they were both student athletes. Felter was a member of the rowing team. On September 30, 2024, Brink and Felter got engaged after he proposed to her at the Shangri-La Hotel in Paris. Brink had been in Paris attending the Balenciaga fashion show. November 14, 2026 has been set as their wedding date.

Brink has advocated for the destigmatization of mental illness, publicly sharing her personal struggles during the COVID-19 pandemic and the benefits of counseling. In September 2022, she received the CalHOPE Courage Award, presented by the College Sports Information Directors of America to student-athletes in California for overcoming stress, anxiety and mental trauma.
