= Tina Langley =

American collegiate basketball coach

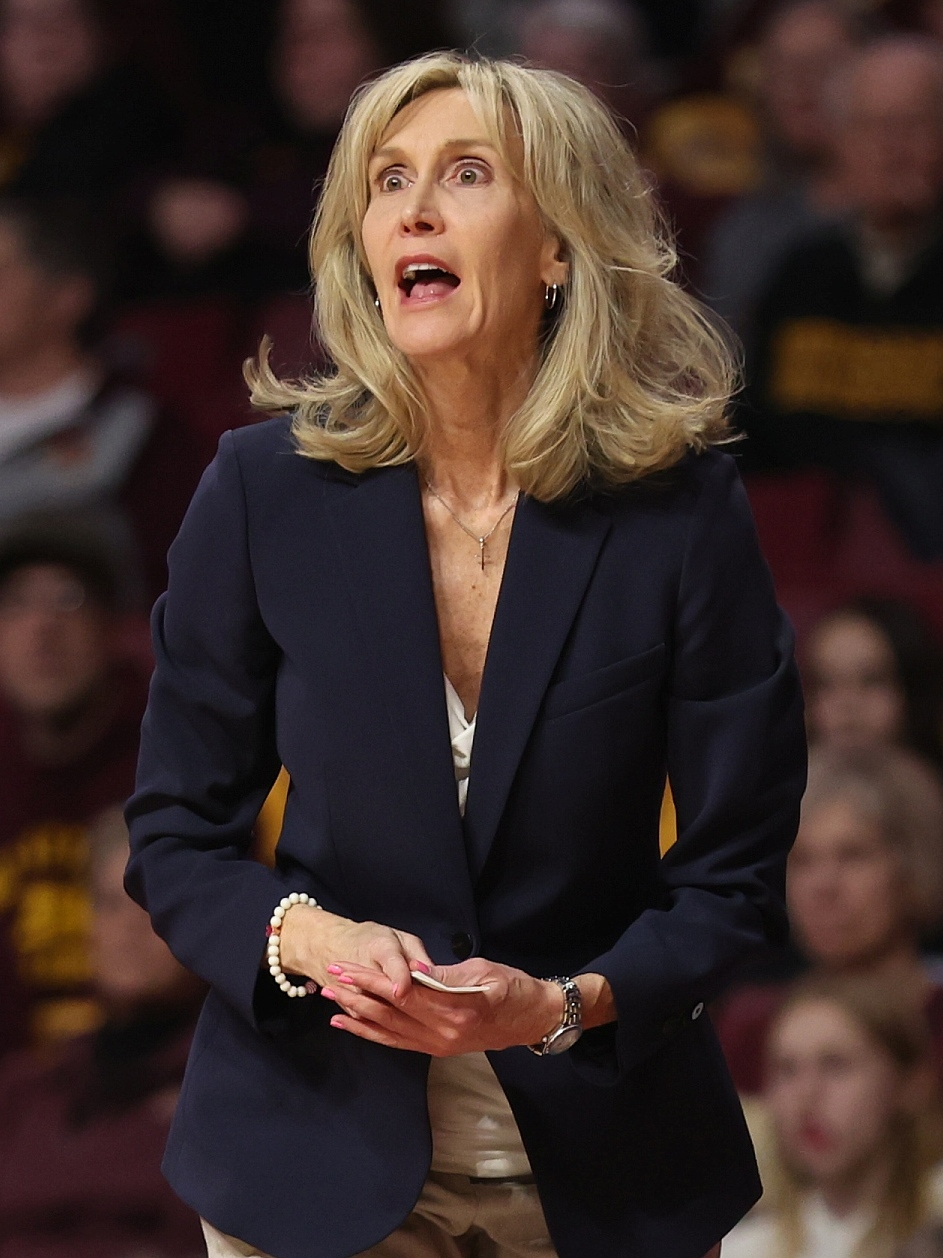
- Langley with Washington in 2025

Current position
- Title: Head coach
- Team: Washington
- Conference: Big Ten
- Record: 86–71 (.548)

Biographical details
- Born: September 3, 1973 (age 53); Jasper, Alabama, U.S.

Playing career
- 1991–1993: Bevill State CC
- 1993–1995: West Alabama
- Position: Point guard

Coaching career (HC unless noted)
- 1998–2003: Toledo (assistant)
- 2003–2005: Clemson (assistant)
- 2005: Georgia (assistant)
- 2008–2015: Maryland (assistant)
- 2015–2021: Rice
- 2021–present: Washington

Head coaching record
- Overall: 212–132 (.616)

Tina Michelle Langley (born September 3, 1973) is the current head coach of the Washington Huskies women's basketball team. From 2015 to 2021, she was head coach for the Rice Owls women's basketball team. Before joining Rice, she served as an associate head coach for the Maryland Terrapins women's basketball team, helping the program advance to the Final Four in 2014 and 2015.

== Head coaching record ==
Record table
Season	Team	Overall	Conference	Standing	Postseason
Rice Owls (Conference USA) (2015–2021)
2015–16	Rice	9–22	6–11	T–8th	
2016–17	Rice	22–13	8–10	T–8th	WBI champions
2017–18	Rice	23–10	10–6	T–3rd	WNIT second round
2018–19	Rice	28–4	16–0	1st	NCAA first round
2019–20	Rice	21–8	16–2	1st	Postseason canceled
2020–21	Rice	22–4	12–2	1st	WNIT champions
Rice:		126–61 (.674)	68–31 (.687)		
Washington Huskies (Pac-12 Conference) (2021–2024)
2021–22	Washington	7–16	2–12	12th	
2022–23	Washington	19–15	7–11	T–8th	WNIT Fab 4
2023–24	Washington	16–15	6–12	10th	WBIT First Round
Washington (Pac-12):		42–46 (.477)	15–35 (.300)		
Washington Huskies (Big Ten Conference) (2024–present)
2024–25	Washington	19–14	9–9	12th	NCAA First Four
2025–26	Washington	22–11	10–8	8th	NCAA Second Round
2026–27	Washington	3–0	0–0		
Washington (Big Ten):		44–25 (.638)	19–17 (.528)		
Washington (Overall):		86–71 (.548)	34–52 (.395)		
Total:		212–132 (.616)			
National champion Postseason invitational champion Conference regular season champion Conference regular season and conference tournament champion Division regular season champion Division regular season and conference tournament champion Conference tournament champion
