= Haley Jones =

American basketball player (born 2001)

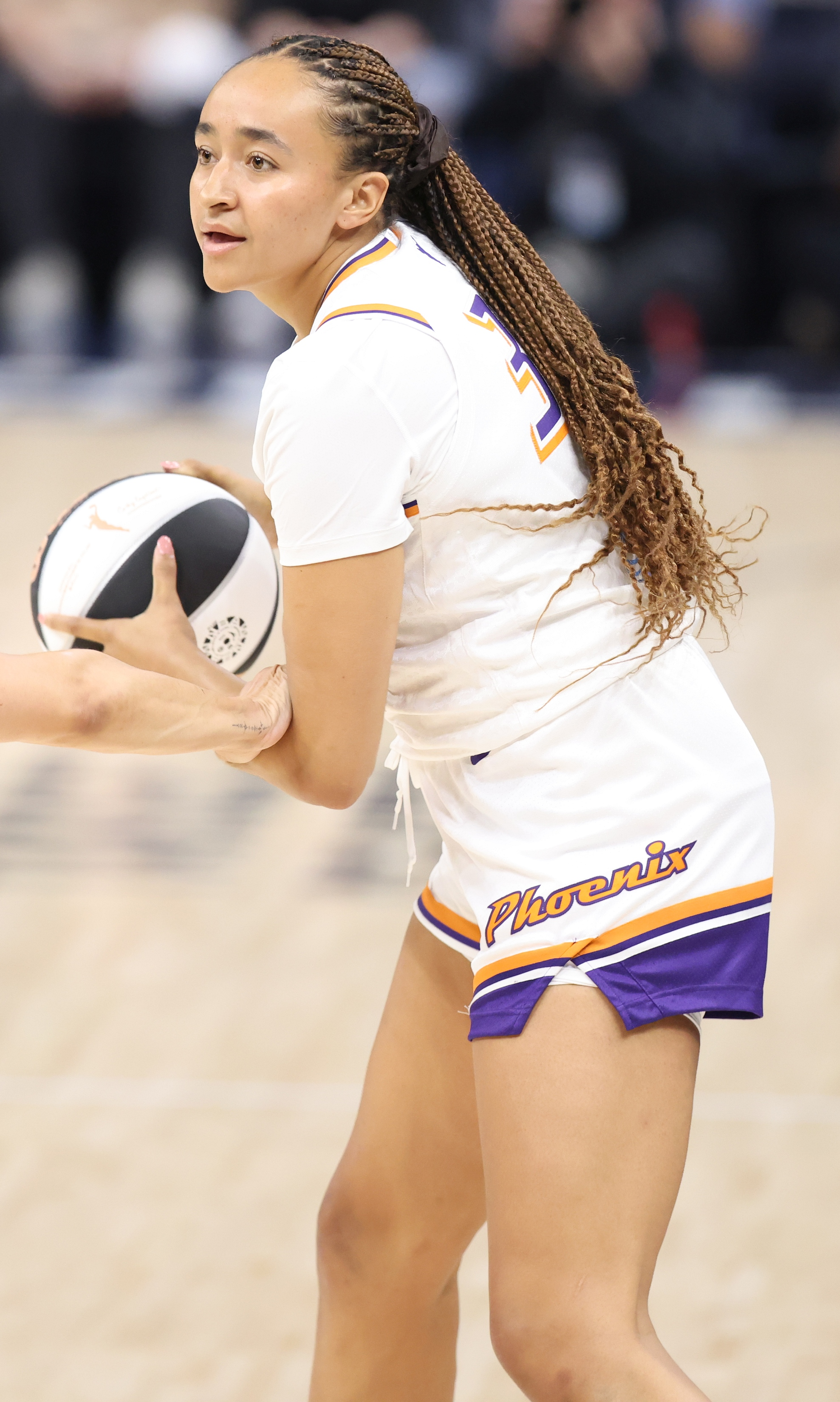
- Jones with the Phoenix Mercury in 2025

No. 30 – Dallas Wings
- Position: Guard

Personal information
- Born: May 23, 2001 (age 25) Santa Cruz, California, U.S.
- Listed height: 6 ft 1 in (1.85 m)
- Listed weight: 202 lb (92 kg)

Career information
- High school: Archbishop Mitty (San Jose, California)
- College: Stanford (2019–2023)
- WNBA draft: 2023: 1st round, 6th overall pick
- Drafted by: Atlanta Dream
- Playing career: 2023–present

Career history
- 2023–2024: Atlanta Dream
- 2024–2025: Geelong United
- 2025: Phoenix Mercury
- 2025: Dallas Wings
- 2026: Portland Fire
- 2026–present: Dallas Wings

Career highlights
- NCAA champion (2021); NCAA Tournament MOP (2021); Third-team All-American – AP, USBWA (2023); First-team All-American – AP (2022); Second-team All-American – USBWA (2022); WBCA Coaches' All-American (2022); Pac-12 Co-Player of the Year (2022); Pac-12 Tournament MOP (2022); 3× All-Pac-12 (2021–2023); Naismith Prep Player of the Year (2019); Morgan Wootten Player of the Year (2019); McDonald's All-American (2019)
- Stats at Basketball Reference
Medals
Women's basketball
Representing the United States
FIBA AmeriCup
Gold medal – first place	2021 Puerto Rico	Team
FIBA Under-17 World Cup
Gold medal – first place	2018 Belarus	Team

Haley Jones (born May 23, 2001) is an American professional basketball player for the Dallas Wings of the Women's National Basketball Association (WNBA). She played college basketball for the Stanford Cardinal of the Pac-12 Conference, helping the team win the national championship in 2021 while being named the Final Four Most Outstanding Player. She was selected sixth overall in the 2023 WNBA draft by the Atlanta Dream.

== Early life ==
Jones was born in Santa Cruz, California. She attended Archbishop Mitty High School in San Jose, where she was named the Naismith Prep Player of the Year and a McDonald's All-American as a senior in 2019. A five-star recruit, Jones was ranked the number one recruit in the 2019 class by ESPN.

== College career ==
As a freshman at Stanford University in 2019–20, Jones averaged 11.4 points, 4.2 rebounds and 2.4 assists before suffering a season-ending, knee ligament injury. Jones returned to play in the 2020–21 season, averaging 13.2 points, 7.4 rebounds and 2.8 assists per game. She was subsequently named an all-conference selection in the Pac-12 Conference. Jones and the Cardinal won the 2021 NCAA tournament, their first national title since 1992. Jones was named the Final Four Most Outstanding Player.

== Professional career ==
=== WNBA ===
==== Atlanta Dream (2023–2024) ====
Jones was selected sixth overall in the 2023 WNBA draft by the Atlanta Dream. In 40 games during the 2023 WNBA season, she averaged 3.9 points, 2.2 rebounds and 2.1 assists per game. In 40 games during the 2024 WNBA season, she averaged 3.7 points, 2.4 rebounds and 2.3 assists per game.

Jones was waived by the Dream on May 14, 2025.

==== Phoenix Mercury (2025) ====
On June 1, 2025, Jones signed a hardship contract with the Phoenix Mercury. On June 8, she was waived by the Mercury.

==== Dallas Wings (2025) ====
Over a week later, Jones was signed by the Dallas Wings as part of their hardship exception, with the team losing several players to injury and both Teaira McCowan and Luisa Geiselsöder being unavailable while competing in the 2025 FIBA Women’s Eurobasket. On June 29, she was waived by the Wings. The Wings signed Jones to a rest-of-season contract on July 9, 2025.

Towards the end of the 2025 regular season, Jones was featured, along with Diamond DeShields, Julie Vanloo, Harmoni Turner, and Shyanne Sellers, in an ESPN article on life on the WNBA fringe given the league's limit of only 12 roster spots per team.

==== Portland Fire (2026) ====
On April 3, 2026, she was drafted 15th overall by the Portland Fire in the 2026 WNBA expansion draft.

On May 21, 2026, Jones was waived by the Portland Fire.

==== Return to Dallas Wings (2026-present) ====
On June 22, 2026, Jones signed a player development contract with the Dallas Wings.

=== WNBL ===
On August 29, 2024, Jones signed with Geelong United of the Women's National Basketball League (WNBL) for the 2024–25 season.

== Career statistics ==
Legend
GP	Games played	GS	Games started	MPG	Minutes per game	RPG	Rebounds per game
APG	Assists per game	SPG	Steals per game	BPG	Blocks per game	PPG	Points per game
TO	Turnovers per game	FG%	Field-goal percentage	3P%	3-point field-goal percentage	FT%	Free-throw percentage
**Bold**	Career best	°	League leader

*	Denotes season(s) in which Jones won an NCAA Championship

=== WNBA ===
==== Regular season ====
Stats current through end of 2025 season

WNBA regular season statistics
Year	Team	GP	GS	MPG	FG%	3P%	FT%	RPG	APG	SPG	BPG	TO	PPG
2023	Atlanta	**40**	6	14.6	.337	.214	**.756**	2.4	2.3	0.4	0.3	1.4	3.7
2024	Atlanta	**40**	**24**	17.8	.397	.214	.702	2.2	2.1	0.4	0.3	1.7	3.9
2025	Phoenix	4	0	12.0	.333	**.500**	.000	2.0	1.0	0.3	0.3	**0.5**	2.3
2025	Dallas	24	16	**22.8**	**.460**	.297	.629	**3.8**	**2.5**	**0.8**	**0.9**	1.9	**8.1**
**Career**	3 years, 4 teams	108	46	17.5	.398	.253	.699	2.6	2.2	0.5	0.4	1.6	4.7

==== Playoffs ====
WNBA playoff statistics
Year	Team	GP	GS	MPG	FG%	3P%	FT%	RPG	APG	SPG	BPG	TO	PPG
2023	Atlanta	1	0	3.0	**1.000**	—	**1.000**	0.0	0.0	0.0	0.0	**0.0**	**4.0**
2024	Atlanta	**2**	0	**9.0**	.429	—	**1.000**	**1.0**	**0.5**	**0.5**	0.0	1.0	**4.0**
**Career**	2 years, 1 team	3	0	7.0	.500	—	1.000	0.7	0.3	0.3	0.0	0.7	4.0

=== College ===
NCAA statistics
Year	Team	GP	GS	MPG	FG%	3P%	FT%	RPG	APG	SPG	BPG	TO	PPG
2019–20	Stanford	18	13	25.8	.528	.273	.627	4.2	2.4	0.8	0.9	2.7	11.4
2020–21*	Stanford	32	32	27.6	**.546**	**.353**	.725	7.4	2.8	0.8	0.7	2.5	13.2
2021–22	Stanford	33	31	30.7	.418	.244	**.823**	7.9	3.7	0.5	**1.1**	**2.9**	13.2
2022–23	Stanford	**35**	**35**	**32.7**	.432	.094	.720	**9.0**	**4.0**	**0.9**	0.9	2.8	**13.5**
**Career**		118	111	29.7	46.9	21.9	74.3	7.5	3.4	0.8	0.9	2.7	13.0

== Off the court ==
=== Personal life ===
On April 13, 2021, the Santa Cruz City Council declared that henceforth April 4 will be known as "Haley Jones Day" in recognition of her athletic accomplishments, specifically winning the national championship with Stanford and receiving the NCAA Most Outstanding Player of the Final Four award.

In January 2023, Jones started a podcast with The Players' Tribune called "Sometimes I Hoop."

In 2023, Jones and fellow WNBA player, Jewell Loyd, became co-owners of the Los Angeles Mad Drops, a team within Major League Pickleball (MLP).

In October 2025, she became engaged to Stephen Herron Jr.

=== Philanthropy ===
In February 2024, Jones joined the WNBA Changemakers Collective and their collaboration with VOICEINSPORT (VIS) as a mentor, "aimed at keeping girls in sport and developing diverse leaders on the court and beyond the game."
